= Acyclic graph =

Acyclic graph may refer to:

- Directed acyclic graph, a directed graph without any directed cycles
- Forest (graph theory), an undirected acyclic graph
- Polytree, a directed graph without any undirected cycles
