= Multitree =

Type of graph in mathematics

The butterfly network, a multitree used in distributed computation, showing in red the undirected tree induced by the subgraph reachable from one of its vertices.

In combinatorics and order theory, a multitree may describe either of two equivalent structures: a directed acyclic graph (DAG) in which there is at most one directed path between any two vertices, or equivalently in which the subgraph reachable from any vertex induces an undirected tree, or a partially ordered set (poset) that does not have four items a, b, c, and d forming a diamond suborder with a ≤ b ≤ d and a ≤ c ≤ d but with b and c incomparable to each other (also called a diamond-free poset).

In computational complexity theory, multitrees have also been called strongly unambiguous graphs or mangroves; they can be used to model nondeterministic algorithms in which there is at most one computational path connecting any two states.

Multitrees may be used to represent multiple overlapping taxonomies over the same ground set. If a family tree may contain multiple marriages from one family to another, but does not contain marriages between any two blood relatives, then it forms a multitree.

== Equivalence between DAG and poset definitions ==
In a directed acyclic graph, if there is at most one directed path between any two vertices, or equivalently if the subgraph reachable from any vertex induces an undirected tree, then its reachability relation is a diamond-free partial order. Conversely, in a diamond-free partial order, the transitive reduction identifies a directed acyclic graph in which the subgraph reachable from any vertex induces an undirected tree.

== Diamond-free families ==
A diamond-free family of sets is a family F of sets whose inclusion ordering forms a diamond-free poset. If D(n) denotes the largest possible diamond-free family of subsets of an n-element set, then it is known that

$$2\le \lim_{n\to\infty} D(n) \Big/ \binom{n}{\lfloor n/2\rfloor}\le 2\frac{3}{11}$$,

and it is conjectured that the limit is 2.

== Related structures ==
A polytree, a directed acyclic graph formed by orienting the edges of an undirected tree, is a special case of a multitree.

The subgraph reachable from any vertex in a multitree is an arborescence rooted in the vertex, that is a polytree in which all edges are oriented away from the root.

The word "multitree" has also been used to refer to a series–parallel partial order, or to other structures formed by combining multiple trees.
