= Pre-topological order =

In the field of computer science, a pre-topological order or pre-topological ordering of a directed graph is a linear ordering of its vertices such that if there is a directed path from vertex u to vertex v and v comes before u in the ordering, then there is also a directed path from vertex v to vertex u.

If the graph is a directed acyclic graph (DAG), topological orderings are pre-topological orderings and vice versa. In other cases, any pre-topological ordering gives a partial order.
