= Edge connectivity =

Graph which remains connected when fewer than k edges are removed

In graph theory, a connected graph is k-edge-connected if it remains connected whenever fewer than k edges are removed.

The edge-connectivity of a graph is the largest k for which the graph is k-edge-connected.

Edge connectivity and the enumeration of k-edge-connected graphs was studied by Camille Jordan in 1869.

== Formal definition ==
A 2-edge-connected graph

Let $G = (V, E)$ be an arbitrary graph. If the subgraph $G' = (V, E \setminus X)$ is connected for all $X \subseteq E$ where $|X| < k$, then G is said to be k-edge-connected. The edge connectivity of $G$ is the maximum value k such that G is k-edge-connected. The smallest set X whose removal disconnects G is a minimum cut in G.

The edge connectivity version of Menger's theorem provides an alternative and equivalent characterization, in terms of edge-disjoint paths in the graph. If and only if every two vertices of G form the endpoints of k paths, no two of which share an edge with each other, then G is k-edge-connected. In one direction this is easy: if a system of paths like this exists, then every set X of fewer than k edges is disjoint from at least one of the paths, and the pair of vertices remains connected to each other even after X is deleted. In the other direction, the existence of a system of paths for each pair of vertices in a graph that cannot be disconnected by the removal of few edges can be proven using the max-flow min-cut theorem from the theory of network flows.

== Related concepts ==
Minimum vertex degree gives a trivial upper bound on edge-connectivity. That is, if a graph $G = (V, E)$ is k-edge-connected then it is necessary that k ≤ δ(G), where δ(G) is the minimum degree of any vertex v ∈ V. Deleting all edges incident to a vertex v would disconnect v from the graph.

Edge connectivity is the dual concept to girth, the length of the shortest cycle in a graph, in the sense that the girth of a planar graph is the edge connectivity of its dual graph, and vice versa. These concepts are unified in matroid theory by the girth of a matroid, the size of the smallest dependent set in the matroid. For a graphic matroid, the matroid girth equals the girth of the underlying graph, while for a co-graphic matroid it equals the edge connectivity.

The 2-edge-connected graphs can also be characterized by the absence of bridges, by the existence of an ear decomposition, or by Robbins' theorem according to which these are exactly the graphs that have a strong orientation.

By a corollary of the Nash-Williams theorem, the edge-connectivity of a graph provides bounds on how many edge-disjoint spanning trees can be found within the graph.

== Computational aspects ==
There is a polynomial-time algorithm to determine the largest k for which a graph G is k-edge-connected. A simple algorithm would, for every pair (u,v), determine the maximum flow from u to v with the capacity of all edges in G set to 1 for both directions. A graph is k-edge-connected if and only if the maximum flow from u to v is at least k for any pair (u,v), so k is the least u-v-flow among all (u,v).

If n is the number of vertices in the graph, this simple algorithm would perform $O(n^2)$ iterations of the Maximum flow problem, which can be solved in $O(n^3)$ time. Hence the complexity of the simple algorithm described above is $O(n^5)$ in total.

An improved algorithm will solve the maximum flow problem for every pair (u,v) where u is arbitrarily fixed while v varies over all vertices. This reduces the complexity to $O(n^4)$ and is sound since, if a cut of capacity less than k exists, it is bound to separate u from some other vertex. It can be further improved by an algorithm of Gabow that runs in worst case $O(n^3)$ time.

The Karger–Stein variant of Karger's algorithm provides a faster randomized algorithm for determining the connectivity, with expected runtime $O(n^2\log^3 n)$.

A related problem: finding the minimum k-edge-connected spanning subgraph of G (that is: select as few as possible edges in G that your selection is k-edge-connected) is NP-hard for $k\geq 2$.

== See also ==
- k-vertex-connected graph
- Connectivity (graph theory)
- Matching preclusion
