= Polytree =

Type of graph in mathematics

A polytree

In mathematics, and more specifically in graph theory, a polytree (also called directed tree, oriented tree or singly connected network) is a directed acyclic graph whose underlying undirected graph is a tree. In other words, a polytree is formed by assigning an orientation to each edge of a connected and acyclic undirected graph.

A polyforest (or directed forest or oriented forest) is a directed acyclic graph whose underlying undirected graph is a forest. In other words, if we replace its directed edges with undirected edges, we obtain an undirected graph that is acyclic.

A polytree is an example of an oriented graph.

The term polytree was coined in 1987 by Rebane and Pearl.

== Related structures ==
- An arborescence is a directed rooted tree, i.e. a directed acyclic graph in which there exists a single source node that has a unique path to every other node. Every arborescence is a polytree, but not every polytree is an arborescence.
- A multitree is a directed acyclic graph in which the subgraph reachable from any node forms a tree. Every polytree is a multitree.
- The reachability relationship among the nodes of a polytree forms a partial order that has order dimension at most three. If the order dimension is three, there must exist a subset of seven elements $x$, $y_i$, and $z_i$ (for $i=0,1,2$) such that, for each $i$, either $x\le y_i\ge z_i$ or $x\ge y_i\le z_i$, with these six inequalities defining the polytree structure on these seven elements.
- A fence or zigzag poset is a special case of a polytree in which the underlying tree is a path and the edges have orientations that alternate along the path. The reachability ordering in a polytree has also been called a generalized fence.

== Enumeration ==
The number of distinct polytrees on $n$ unlabeled nodes, for $n=1,2,3,\dots$, is

1, 1, 3, 8, 27, 91, 350, 1376, 5743, 24635, 108968, 492180, ... (sequence A000238 in the OEIS).

== Sumner's conjecture ==
Sumner's conjecture, named after David Sumner, states that tournaments are universal graphs for polytrees, in the sense that every tournament with $2n-2$ vertices contains every polytree with $n$ vertices as a subgraph. Although it remains unsolved, it has been proven for all sufficiently large values of $n$.

== Applications ==
Polytrees have been used as a graphical model for probabilistic reasoning. If a Bayesian network has the structure of a polytree, then belief propagation may be used to perform inference efficiently on it.

The contour tree of a real-valued function on a vector space is a polytree that describes the level sets of the function. The nodes of the contour tree are the level sets that pass through a critical point of the function and the edges describe contiguous sets of level sets without a critical point. The orientation of an edge is determined by the comparison between the function values on the corresponding two level sets.

== See also ==
- Glossary of graph theory
