= Order dimension =

Mathematical measure for partial orders

A partial order of dimension 4 (shown as a Hasse diagram) and four total orderings that form a realizer for this partial order.

In mathematics, the dimension of a partially ordered set (poset) is the smallest number of total orders the intersection of which gives rise to the partial order. This concept is also sometimes called the order dimension or the Dushnik–Miller dimension of the partial order.

== Formal definition ==
The order dimension of a poset $P$ is the least integer $t$ for which there exists a family

$$\mathcal R=(<_1,\dots,<_t)$$

of linear extensions of $P$ so that, for every $x$ and $y$ in $P$, $x$ precedes $y$ in $P$ if and only if it precedes $y$ in all of the linear extensions, if any such $t$ exists. In other words, that the intersection of those linear extensions equals $P$. That is,

$$P=\bigcap\mathcal R=\bigcap_{i=1}^t <_i.$$

An alternative definition of order dimension is the minimal number of total orders such that P embeds into their product with componentwise ordering i.e. $x \leq y$ if and only if $x_i \leq y_i$ for all i.

== Realizers ==
A family $\mathcal R=(<_1,\dots,<_t)$ of total orders on $X$ is called a realizer of a poset $P = (X, <_P)$ if

$$<_P = \bigcap\mathcal R$$,

which is to say that for any $x$ and $y$ in $X$, $x <_P y$ precisely when $x <_1 y, x <_2 y$ ,..., $x <_t y$. Thus, an equivalent definition of the dimension of a poset $P$ is "the least cardinality of a realizer of $P$ ".

It can be shown that any nonempty family $\mathcal R$ of linear extensions is a realizer of a finite partially ordered set $P$ if and only if, for every critical pair $(x,y)$ of , $P$ $x <_i y$ for some order $<_i$ in $\mathcal R$.

== Example ==
Let n be a positive integer, and let P be the partial order on the elements a_{i} and b_{i} (for 1 ≤ i ≤ n) in which a_{i} ≤ b_{j} whenever i ≠ j, but no other pairs are comparable. In particular, a_{i} and b_{i} are incomparable in P; P can be viewed as an oriented form of a crown graph. The illustration shows an ordering of this type for n = 4.

Then, for each i, any realizer must contain a linear order that begins with all the a_{j} except a_{i} (in some order), then includes b_{i}, then a_{i}, and ends with all the remaining b_{j}. This is so because if there were a realizer that didn't include such an order, then the intersection of that realizer's orders would have a_{i} preceding b_{i}, which would contradict the incomparability of a_{i} and b_{i} in P. And conversely, any family of linear orders that includes one order of this type for each i has P as its intersection. Thus, P has dimension exactly n. In fact, P is known as the standard example of a poset of dimension n, and is usually denoted by S_{n}.

== Order dimension two ==
The partial orders with order dimension two may be characterized as the partial orders whose comparability graph is the complement of the comparability graph of a different partial order. That is, P is a partial order with order dimension two if and only if there exists a partial order Q on the same set of elements, such that every pair x, y of distinct elements is comparable in exactly one of these two partial orders. If P is realized by two linear extensions, then partial order Q complementary to P may be realized by reversing one of the two linear extensions. Therefore, the comparability graphs of the partial orders of dimension two are exactly the permutation graphs, graphs that are both themselves comparability graphs and complementary to comparability graphs.

The partial orders of order dimension two include the series-parallel partial orders. They are exactly the partial orders whose Hasse diagrams have dominance drawings, which can be obtained by using the positions in the two permutations of a realizer as Cartesian coordinates.

== Computational complexity ==
It is possible to determine in polynomial time whether a given finite partially ordered set has order dimension at most two, for instance, by testing whether the comparability graph of the partial order is a permutation graph. However, for any k ≥ 3, it is NP-complete to test whether the order dimension is at most k.. Moreover, there exists no polynomial-time algorithm that approximates the dimension of a given $n$-element poset within a factor of $O(n^{1-\varepsilon})$ for any $\varepsilon>0$, unless NP = ZPP.

== Order dimension of incidence posets of graphs ==
The incidence poset of any undirected graph G has the vertices and edges of G as its elements; in this poset, x ≤ y if either x = y or x is a vertex, y is an edge, and x is an endpoint of y. Certain kinds of graphs may be characterized by the order dimensions of their incidence posets: a graph is a path graph if and only if the order dimension of its incidence poset is at most two, and according to Schnyder's theorem it is a planar graph if and only if the order dimension of its incidence poset is at most three.

For a complete graph on n vertices, the order dimension of the incidence poset is $\Theta(\log\log n)$. It follows that all simple n-vertex graphs have incidence posets with order dimension $O(\log\log n)$.

=== Order dimension of planar maps ===
Schnyder's theorem can be generalized for the vertex-edge-face incidence poset, denoted by $P_M$, of a planar map $M$. As before $x < y$ if $x$ is a vertex, $y$ an edge and $x$ an endpoint of $y$. On the other hand $x < y$ will be true if $x$ is an edge, $y$ a face and $x$ incident to $y$. Thus, the incidence poset is defined by the natural incidence relations between vertices, edges, and faces.

The order dimension of the vertex-edge-face incidence poset of a planar map (planar graph with fixed plane embedding) is at most four, and $\text{dim}(\textbf{split}(P_M)) \leq 4$. For an order $P=(X,<)$, the $\textbf{split}$ is defined as $\textbf{split}(P) = (X'\cup X'', <_s)$, where $X'$ and $X''$ are two copies of $X$. The order $<_s$ is given by:

- $x' <_s x'' \quad\forall x\in X$
- $x' <_s y''$ if and only if $x < y$.

The split order always has dimension within one of the original order: $\text{dim}(P) \leq \text{dim}(\textbf{split}(P)) \leq \text{dim}(P) + 1$.

The proof that the order dimension of the split incidence poset of a planar map is at most four constructs a grid intersection representation of the respective planar map in which incidences correspond to intersections of axis-parallel segments. This representation makes it possible to construct four linear extensions whose intersection realizes the split incidence poset, establishing the dimension bound of four.

== k-dimension and 2-dimension ==
A generalization of dimension is the notion of k-dimension (written $\textrm{dim}_k$) which is the minimal number of chains of length at most k in whose product the partial order can be embedded. In particular, the 2-dimension of an order can be seen as the size of the smallest set such that the order embeds in the inclusion order on this set.

== See also ==
- Interval dimension
