= Covering relation =

Mathematical relation inside orderings

The Hasse diagram of the power set of three elements, partially ordered by inclusion.

In mathematics, especially order theory, the covering relation of a partially ordered set is the binary relation which holds between comparable elements that are immediate neighbours. The covering relation is commonly used to graphically express the partial order by means of the Hasse diagram.

== Definition ==
Let $X$ be a set with a partial order $\le$. As usual, let $<$ be the relation on $X$ such that $x<y$ if and only if $x\le y$ and $x\neq y$.

Let $x$ and $y$ be elements of $X$.

Then $y$ covers $x$, written $x\lessdot y$, if $x<y$ and there is no element $z$ such that $x<z<y$. Equivalently, $y$ covers $x$ if the interval $[x,y]$ is the two-element set $\{x,y\}$. In more intuitive words, $x\lessdot y$ if $y$ immediately supersedes or succeeds $x$ in terms of their respective poset's order relation.

When $x\lessdot y$, it is said that $y$ is a cover of $x$. Some authors also use the term cover to denote any such pair $(x,y)$ in the covering relation.

== Examples ==
- In a finite linearly ordered set $\{1, 2, ..., n\}$, $i+1$ covers $i$ for all $i$ between $1$ and $n-1$, and there are no other covering relations.
- In the Boolean algebra of the power set of a set S, a subset B of S covers a subset A of S if and only if B is obtained from A by adding one element not in A.
- In Young's lattice, formed by the partitions of all nonnegative integers, a partition λ covers a partition μ if and only if the Young diagram of λ is obtained from the Young diagram of μ by adding an extra cell.
- The Hasse diagram depicting the covering relation of a Tamari lattice is the skeleton of an associahedron.
- The covering relation of any finite distributive lattice forms a median graph.
- On the real numbers with the usual total order ≤, no number covers another. Any such partial order in which the covering relation is empty is called "dense."

== Properties ==
- If a partially ordered set is finite, its covering relation is the transitive reduction of the partial order relation. Such partially ordered sets are therefore completely described by their Hasse diagrams. On the other hand, in a dense order, such as the rational numbers with the standard order, no element covers another.
