= Design structure matrix =

Decision tracking and managing method

A sample DSM with 7 elements and 11 dependency marks

The design structure matrix (DSM; also referred to as dependency structure matrix, dependency structure method, dependency source matrix, problem solving matrix, incidence matrix, N^{2} matrix, interaction matrix, dependency map or design precedence matrix) is a simple, compact and visual representation of a system or project in the form of a square matrix.

It is the equivalent of an adjacency matrix in graph theory, and is used in systems engineering and project management to model the structure of complex systems or processes, in order to perform system analysis, project planning and organization design. Don Steward coined the term "design structure matrix" in the 1960s, using the matrices to solve mathematical systems of equations.

== Overview ==
A design structure matrix lists all constituent subsystems/activities and the corresponding information exchange, interactions, and dependency patterns. For example, where the matrix elements represent activities, the matrix details what pieces of information are needed to start a particular activity, and shows where the information generated by that activity leads. In this way, one can quickly recognize which other activities are reliant upon information outputs generated by each activity.

The use of DSMs in both research and industrial practice increased greatly in the 1990s. DSMs have been applied in the building construction, real estate development, semiconductor, automotive, photographic, aerospace, telecom, small-scale manufacturing, factory equipment, and electronics industries, to name a few, as well as in many government agencies.

The matrix representation has several strengths.

- The matrix can represent a large number of system elements and their relationships in a compact way that highlights important patterns in the data (such as feedback loops and modules).
- The presentation is amenable to matrix-based analysis techniques, which can be used to improve the structure of the system.
- In modeling activities precedence it allows representing feedback linkages that cannot be modeled by Gantt chart/PERT modeling techniques

DSM analysis can also be used to manage the effects of a change. For example, if the specification for a component had to be changed, it would be possible to quickly identify all processes or activities which had been dependent on that specification, reducing the risk that work continues based on out-of-date information.

== DSM Structure ==
A DSM is a square matrix, representing linkages between the system elements. The system elements are often labeled in the rows to the left of the matrix and/or in the columns above the matrix. These elements can represent for example product components, organization teams, or project activities.

The off-diagonal cells are used to indicate relationships between the elements. A marking of the cell indicates a directed link between two elements and can represent design relations or constraints between product components, communication between teams, information flow or precedence relations between activities. In one convention, reading across a row reveals the outputs that the element in that row provides to other elements, and scanning a column reveals the inputs that the element in that column receives from other elements. For example, in the DSM, the marking in column A and row C indicated a link from A to C (output from A, input to C). Alternatively, the rows and columns may be switched (without a change of meaning). Both conventions may be found in the literature.

The cells along the diagonal are typically used to represent the system elements. However, the diagonal cells can be used for representing self-iterations (e.g., rework of a code that did not pass its unit testing). Self-iterations are required when a matrix element represents a block of activities/subsystems that may be further detailed, allowing hierarchical DSM structure.

Two main categories of DSMs have been proposed: static and time-based. Static DSMs represent systems where all of the elements exist simultaneously, such as components of a machine or groups in an organization. A static DSM is equivalent to an N^{2} chart or an adjacency matrix. The marking in the off-diagonal cells is often largely symmetrical to the diagonal (e.g., in an organizational DSM indicating interactions between teams, there are both a mark from team C to team E and a mark from team E to team C, thus indicating that interactions are mutual). Static DSMs are usually analyzed with clustering algorithms.

A time-based DSM is akin to a precedence diagram or the matrix representation of a directed graph. In time-based DSMs, the ordering of the rows and columns indicates a flow through time: earlier activities in a process appear in the upper-left of the DSM and later activities appear in the lower-right. Terms like “feedforward” and “feedback” become meaningful when referring to interfaces. A feedback mark is an above-diagonal mark (when rows represent output). Time-based DSMs are typically analyzed using sequencing algorithms, that reorder the matrix elements to minimize the amount of feedback marks, and make them as close as possible to the diagonal.

DSM matrices were categorized to Component-based or Architecture DSM; People-based (Team-based) or Organization DSM, both considered as Static (representing existing elements). Activity-based or Schedule DSM and Parameter-based DSM are defined as time-based, as their ordering implies flow.

=== DSM marking ===
Initially, the off-diagonal cell markings indicated only the existence/non-existence of an interaction (link) between elements, using a symbol (or the figure '1'). Such marking is defined as Binary DSM. The marking then has developed to indicate quantitative relation Numeric DSM indicating the "strength" of the linkage, or statistical relations Probability DSM indicating for example the probability of applying new information (that require reactivation of the linked activity).

== Examples ==
In the following example DSMs, a mark in row i and column j means that element i receives input from element j. With this convention, in a time-based DSM, marks below the diagonal are feedforward and marks above the diagonal are feedback. Shaded cells are on the diagonal.

=== Example 1: a static DSM with two hidden modules ===
Six components, A to F, have seven mutual interactions: A–B, A–C, B–C, D–E, D–F, E–F and C–D. Because the interactions are mutual, the DSM is symmetric. In the order (A, D, B, E, C, F) the marks are scattered, and the modular structure is not visible:

Example 1: binary static DSM
	A	D	B	E	C	F
A			X		X	
D				X	X	X
B	X				X	
E		X				X
C	X	X	X			
F		X		X		

=== Example 2: a numeric static DSM with a weakly attached element ===
This is a numeric version of Example 1 with a seventh component, G. The interactions inside {A, B, C} and inside {D, E, F} have strength 3, the interaction C–D has strength 2, and G interacts only with F, with strength 1:

Example 2: numeric static DSM
	A	B	C	D	E	F	G
A		3	3				
B	3		3				
C	3	3		2			
D			2		3	3	
E				3		3	
F				3	3		1
G						1	

=== Example 3: a time-based DSM with a cycle ===
Five activities have the following dependencies: B needs A, C needs B, B needs C, D needs C, E needs A, and E needs D. Listed in the order (E, D, C, B, A), five of the six marks are above the diagonal, that is, they are feedback:

Example 3: binary time-based DSM
	E	D	C	B	A
E		X			X
D			X		
C				X	
B			X		X
A					

=== Example 4: a weighted feedback cycle ===
Three activities form a cycle of dependencies with different strengths: A needs C (weight 1), B needs A (weight 3), and C needs B (weight 2). In the order (B, C, A), the dependency "B needs A" is feedback, with weight 3:

Example 4: numeric time-based DSM
	B	C	A
B			3
C	2		
A		1	

== DSM algorithms ==
DSM algorithms reorder the rows and columns of the matrix, and sometimes group them, so that the structure of the system becomes visible. Because a DSM is the adjacency matrix of a graph, almost every DSM algorithm solves a known problem in graph theory or cluster analysis. A static DSM corresponds to an undirected graph (possibly with edge weights, for a numeric DSM), and the main task is to group the elements into modules. A time-based DSM corresponds to a directed graph, and the main task is to order the elements so that information flows forward as much as possible. Static DSMs are usually analyzed with clustering algorithms, and time-based DSMs with partitioning, tearing and sequencing algorithms.

The following table summarizes the problems treated in this section.

Algorithmic problems on DSMs
DSM type	Question	Graph or data problem	Example algorithms
Static (component, team)	Which elements should be grouped into modules?	Minimum cut, minimum k-cut, balanced graph partition	Stoer–Wagner, Kernighan–Lin, METIS
Static	Same, with the number of modules not known in advance	Modularity maximization, correlation clustering	Louvain method, approximation algorithms for correlation clustering
Static	Same, treating each element as a data point	Vector or similarity-based clustering	k-means, k-medoids, hierarchical clustering, spectral clustering
Time-based (activity, parameter)	Which activities must be iterated together, and in what order do the groups run?	Strongly connected components, topological sorting	Tarjan, Kosaraju
Time-based	In what order should coupled activities run?	Minimum feedback arc set	Exact integer programming, greedy heuristics, genetic algorithms

=== Clustering static DSMs ===
Problem. The input is a static DSM, usually symmetric, with binary or numeric marks. The output is a partition of the elements into clusters (modules, teams or subsystems), together with an ordering of the rows and columns in which every cluster occupies a contiguous block. A good clustering puts most of the marks inside the square blocks along the diagonal and few marks outside them.

Expected output for Example 1. With two clusters, a clustering algorithm should return the clusters {A, B, C} and {D, E, F}, and the reordering (A, B, C, D, E, F):

Example 1, clustered
	A	B	C	D	E	F
A		X	X			
B	X		X			
C	X	X		X		
D			X		X	X
E				X		X
F				X	X	

Only the C–D interaction now lies outside the two diagonal blocks. It is the single interface between the two modules, and it is the interaction that the two module teams must coordinate.

==== Graph-cut formulations ====
Since marks outside the diagonal blocks are interactions between clusters, the most direct formulation is to cut the graph into parts so that the total weight of the edges between the parts is as small as possible.

- Two clusters: minimum cut. Splitting the elements into two non-empty groups with the smallest total weight between them is solvable in polynomial time. Stoer and Wagner gave a short deterministic algorithm for minimum cuts in undirected edge-weighted graphs that, unlike most earlier methods, does not use network flows. In Example 1, the minimum cut removes only the C–D link and returns the two modules.
- Many clusters: minimum k-cut. Splitting the elements into k non-empty groups with the smallest total weight between them can be done in polynomial time when k is fixed, but is NP-hard when k is part of the input, as shown by Goldschmidt and Hochbaum. Saran and Vazirani gave two simple algorithms that always find a k-cut whose weight is within a factor of 2 − 2/k of the optimum.
- The need for balance. Pure minimum cuts tend to separate a single, weakly connected element instead of a meaningful module. In Example 2, the minimum cut is {G} against all the others (weight 1), and the minimum 3-cut is {A, B, C}, {D, E, F}, {G} (weight 3), which isolates G again. Requiring every cluster to contain at least three elements forces the expected answer {A, B, C} and {D, E, F, G}, with cut weight 2. This variant is the balanced graph partition problem. Kernighan and Lin studied the problem of partitioning a graph with edge costs into subsets of given sizes so as to minimize the total cost of the edges cut, motivated by assigning circuit components to circuit boards, and gave a fast heuristic for it (the Kernighan–Lin algorithm). Karypis and Kumar developed a multilevel scheme, implemented in METIS, that shrinks the graph by merging vertices, partitions the small graph, and then expands and refines the partition; in their tests it gave better partitions than spectral methods in much less time.
- Normalized cuts and spectral methods. Instead of a hard size constraint, the cut weight can be divided by the total connection weight of each part. Shi and Malik observed that the minimum cut favors cutting off small sets of isolated nodes, and proposed the normalized cut, which measures the cut as a fraction of the total connections of each part. They showed that this criterion can be optimized approximately by solving a generalized eigenvalue problem. This leads to spectral clustering, described below.

==== Formulations without a fixed number of clusters ====
In many DSM applications the number of modules is not known in advance.

- Modularity. Newman and Girvan proposed a measure of the strength of the community structure found in a network, which also serves as an objective way to choose the number of communities. Blondel, Guillaume, Lambiotte and Lefebvre gave a fast heuristic for maximizing modularity (the Louvain method), which repeatedly moves single nodes between communities and then merges each community into a single node, producing a hierarchy of communities. Such a hierarchy corresponds naturally to a hierarchical DSM, in which modules are themselves grouped into larger modules.
- Correlation clustering. Sometimes the analyst knows not only which elements should be together, but also which elements should be kept apart (for example, a regulator and the activity it regulates). Bansal, Blum and Chawla studied the problem in which every pair of items is labeled "similar" (+) or "different" (−), and the goal is a partition that disagrees with as few labels as possible. The number of clusters is not given in advance; it is determined by the labels. They gave a constant-factor approximation algorithm for minimizing disagreements. In DSM terms, positive marks reward putting two elements in the same module, and negative marks reward separating them.

==== Clustering elements as data points ====
A DSM can also be clustered with general-purpose cluster analysis methods, by treating each element as a data point.

- Rows as feature vectors. Each row of the DSM (with a 1 on the diagonal) can be used as a vector that describes which elements the row element interacts with, and the vectors can be grouped with k-means. In Example 1, the rows in clustered order are A = (1,1,1,0,0,0), B = (1,1,1,0,0,0), C = (1,1,1,1,0,0), D = (0,0,1,1,1,1), E = (0,0,0,1,1,1) and F = (0,0,0,1,1,1). With k = 2, the partition {A, B, C}, {D, E, F} is stable under k-means: the cluster means are (1,1,1,⅓,0,0) and (0,0,⅓,1,1,1), and every row is closer to the mean of its own cluster than to the other. k-means can stop at a different, worse partition if it starts from a poor initialization, so it is usually run several times.
- Distances instead of vectors. Methods that need only pairwise similarities or distances, such as k-medoids and agglomerative hierarchical clustering, can use the DSM entries directly as similarities; for instance, the strengths in Example 2 can serve as similarities between components. Hierarchical clustering returns a dendrogram, which again corresponds to a hierarchical DSM.
- Spectral clustering. Spectral clustering combines the graph view and the vector view. In the common algorithms, one computes the first k eigenvectors of a graph Laplacian matrix built from the similarity matrix, uses the rows of the resulting matrix as new points, and clusters these points with k-means. These algorithms can be derived as relaxations of the ratio-cut and normalized-cut problems above.

==== DSM-specific clustering algorithms ====
Several clustering algorithms were developed specifically for DSMs. They typically optimize objectives that the generic methods above do not, such as a penalty for large clusters or special treatment of elements that interact with almost everything. Clustering results would typically show groups (clusters) of tightly related elements, and elements that are either not connected or are connected to many other elements and therefore are not part of a group.

- Thebeau used a clustering routine in which each interaction is assigned a cost that reflects the time and cost of managing it, with different costs for interactions inside and outside subsystems, and the assignment of components to clusters is chosen to minimize the total cost.
- Yu, Yassine and Goldberg scored a clustering by the minimum description length principle and searched for good clusterings with a simple genetic algorithm. On real product architectures, their method reproduced the clustering preferences of human experts.

=== Sequencing time-based DSMs ===
Problem. The input is a time-based DSM, which is generally not symmetric. The output is an ordering of the activities that keeps as many marks as possible below the diagonal (feedforward), so that each activity starts after the activities it depends on. Marks that remain above the diagonal are feedback, and represent iteration or work done on assumptions.

The problem is usually solved in two steps. Partitioning finds the groups of activities that must iterate together and orders the groups; sequencing (often together with tearing) then orders the activities inside each group.

==== Partitioning into blocks ====
Activities that depend on each other directly or indirectly, in a cycle, cannot be ordered without feedback. In graph terms, each such group is a strongly connected component: a maximal set of activities in which every activity can reach every other one along the dependency arcs. Contracting each component to a single node always gives a directed acyclic graph, so the components can be put in a topological order. Placing the components in this order, with the activities of each component next to each other, gives a block-triangular DSM in which all feedback marks lie inside diagonal blocks.

Tarjan gave an algorithm, based on depth-first search, that finds the strongly connected components of a directed graph in time and space linear in the number of vertices and edges (Tarjan's strongly connected components algorithm). The DSM literature also describes older partitioning methods, including path searching, the reachability matrix, triangulation, and the powers of the adjacency matrix. The reachability-based methods compute the transitive closure of the graph; two activities belong to the same block exactly when each can reach the other.

Expected output for Example 3. The strongly connected components are {A}, {B, C}, {D} and {E}, and their topological order is A, {B, C}, D, E. In the partitioned DSM only one of the six marks (B needs C) is above the diagonal, instead of five, and it lies inside the block {B, C}:

Example 3, partitioned
	A	B	C	D	E
A					
B	X		X		
C		X			
D			X		
E	X			X	

B and C must iterate. The other activities can be done once each, in the order shown.

==== Sequencing within blocks ====
Inside a block, some feedback is unavoidable, and the goal is to order the activities so that the feedback is as small as possible. For a binary DSM, choosing an order that leaves the fewest marks above the diagonal is the minimum feedback arc set problem: the marks above the diagonal form a set of arcs whose reversal (or removal) makes the graph acyclic, and conversely every such set corresponds to an order. The decision version of the feedback arc set problem was one of the 21 problems that Karp proved NP-complete, so large blocks are usually sequenced with heuristics. Eades, Lin and Smyth gave a simple feedback arc set heuristic that runs in time linear in the number of arcs and has a good, though not optimal, performance bound.

Numeric and probability DSMs lead to weighted versions of the problem, and to other objectives, for example penalizing a feedback mark more the further it is from the diagonal. Meier, Yassine and Browning applied genetic algorithms to DSM sequencing and found that the size and sparseness of the DSM, and the sequencing objective, can cause serious problems for a simple genetic algorithm; a more advanced ordering genetic algorithm performed better on hard instances. Minimizing feedback loops gets the best results for Binary DSM, but not always for Numeric DSM or Probability DSM. Sequencing algorithms (using optimization, genetic algorithms) are typically trying to minimize the number of feedback loops and also to reorder coupled activities (having cyclic loop) trying to have the feedback marks close to the diagonal. Yet, sometimes the algorithm just tries to minimize a criterion (where minimum iterations is not the optimal results).

Expected output for Example 4. The three activities form a single block. Every order leaves at least one mark above the diagonal, so the minimum feedback arc set has one arc. The best order keeps the lightest dependency as the feedback mark, reducing the feedback weight from 3 to 1:

Example 4, sequenced: order (A, B, C), feedback weight 1
	A	B	C
A			1
B	3		
C		2	

The original order (B, C, A) leaves "B needs A" (weight 3) as feedback, and the order (C, A, B) would leave "C needs B" (weight 2) as feedback.

==== Tearing ====
Tearing is the removal of feedback marks (in Binary DSM) or assignment of lower priority (numeric DSM). In practice, a torn mark means that the receiving activity starts from an estimate or assumption instead of waiting for its input, and the estimate is checked once the input arrives. Choosing which marks to tear so that the rest of the block becomes acyclic is again a feedback arc set problem; choosing which activities should start from assumptions is the related feedback vertex set problem. In Example 4, tearing the mark "A needs C" means that A starts from an estimate of C's output, after which A, B and C can be done in order. Tearing of a Component-based DSM may imply modularization (the component design is not influencing other components) or standardization (the component design is not influencing and not influenced by other components). After tearing a partitioning algorithm is reapplied.

== Use and extensions ==
Interactions between various aspects (people, activities, and components) is done using additional (non-square) linkage matrices. The Multiple Domain Matrix (MDM) is an extension of the basic DSM structure. A MDM includes several DSMs (ordered as block diagonal matrices) that represent the relations between elements of the same domain; and corresponding Domain Mapping Matrices (DMM) that represent relations between elements of different domains.

The use of DSM has been extended to visualize and optimize the otherwise invisible information flow and interactions associated with office work. This visualization via DSM allows the Lean Body of Knowledge to be applied to office and information intensive flows.

A customisation of MDM has been illustrated in for the analysis of underspecified systems.

== Additional links ==
- Web-Portal of DSM Community: http://www.dsmweb.org
- International Design Structure Matrix Conference: http://www.dsm-conference.org
