= Transpose graph =

Directed graph with reversed edges

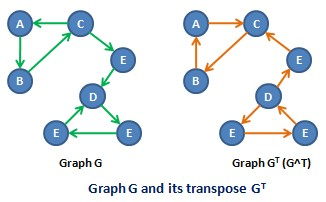
A graph and its transpose

In the mathematical and algorithmic study of graph theory, the converse, transpose or reverse of a directed graph G is another directed graph on the same set of vertices with all of the edges reversed compared to the orientation of the corresponding edges in G. That is, if G contains an edge (u, v) then the converse/transpose/reverse of G contains an edge (v, u) and vice versa.

== Notation ==
The name converse arises because the reversal of arrows corresponds to taking the converse of an implication in logic. The name transpose is because the adjacency matrix of the transpose directed graph is the transpose of the adjacency matrix of the original directed graph.

There is no general agreement on preferred terminology.

The converse is denoted symbolically as G', G^{T}, G^{R}, or other notations, depending on which terminology is used and which book or article is the source for the notation.

== Applications ==
Although there is little difference mathematically between a graph and its transpose, the difference may be larger in computer science, depending on how a given graph is represented. For instance, for the web graph, it is easy to determine the outgoing links of a vertex, but hard to determine the incoming links, while in the reversal of this graph the opposite is true. In graph algorithms, therefore, it may sometimes be useful to construct an explicit representation of the reversal of a graph, in order to put the graph into a form which is more suitable for the operations being performed on it. An example of this is Kosaraju's algorithm for strongly connected components, which applies depth-first search twice, once to the given graph and a second time to its reversal.

== Related concepts ==
A skew-symmetric graph is a graph that is isomorphic to its own transpose graph, via a special kind of isomorphism that pairs up all of the vertices.

The converse relation of a binary relation is the relation that reverses the ordering of each pair of related objects. If the relation is interpreted as a directed graph, this is the same thing as the transpose of the graph. In particular, the dual order of a partial order can be interpreted in this way as the transposition of a transitively-closed directed acyclic graph.

== See also ==
- Converse relation – Reversal of the order of elements of a binary relation
