= Kosaraju (disambiguation) =

Kosaraju (1905–1987) is Telugu poet and lyricist.

Kosaraju may also refer to:

- S. Rao Kosaraju (or Kosaraju Sambasiva Rao), Indian-American professor of computer science at Johns Hopkins University
  - Kosaraju's algorithm, an algorithm to find the strongly connected component of a directed graph
