= Hisao Yamada =

- Born: June 8, 1930
- Died: May 21, 2008 (aged 77)
- Education: University of Pennsylvania
- Scientific career
- Fields: Computer science
- Doctoral advisor: Robert McNaughton
- Doctoral students: S. Rao Kosaraju

Hisao Yamada (山田 尚勇, Yamada Hisao; June 8, 1930 – May 21, 2008) was a Japanese computer scientist, known for his influential contributions to theoretical computer science, as well as for the development of Japanese keyboard layouts, a challenging practical problem. From 1972 to 1991, he was professor of the formal languages division at the Department for Information Science at the University of Tokyo.

== Work ==
In the field of theoretical computer science, Yamada introduced the notion of real-time computability. As his colleague Aravind Joshi recalls:

This work was very positively reviewed not only in the computer science related journals but also in other theoretical journals such as the Journal of Symbolic Logic. Dr. Yamada’s work also played a key role in the early days of the field of computational complexity, by now a very well established area in computer science.

— Aravind Joshi, As cited in: University of Pennsylvania Almanac 55(2), p. 3.

== Selected publications ==
- McNaughton, R.; Yamada, H. (1960). "Regular Expressions and State Graphs for Automata". IEEE Transactions on Electronic Computers. EC-9: 39–47. doi:10.1109/TEC.1960.5221603.
- Yamada, H. (1962). "Real-Time Computation and Recursive Functions Not Real-Time Computable". IEEE Transactions on Electronic Computers. EC-11 (6): 753–760. doi:10.1109/TEC.1962.5219459.
- Hisao Yamada: "A Historical Study of Typewriters and Typing Methods: from the Position of Planning Japanese Parallels", Journal of Information Processing, 2(4) (February 1980), pp. 175–202
