= Nullity (graph theory) =

The nullity of a graph in the mathematical subject of graph theory can mean either of two unrelated numbers. If the graph has n vertices and m edges, then:

- In the matrix theory of graphs, the nullity of the graph is the nullity of the adjacency matrix A of the graph. The nullity of A is given by n − r where r is the rank of the adjacency matrix. This nullity equals the multiplicity of the eigenvalue 0 in the spectrum of the adjacency matrix. See Cvetkovič and Gutman (1972), Cheng and Liu (2007), and Gutman and Borovićanin (2011).
- In the matroid theory the nullity of the graph is the nullity of the oriented incidence matrix M associated with the graph. The nullity of M is given by m − n + c, where, c is the number of components of the graph and n − c is the rank of the oriented incidence matrix. This name is rarely used; the number is more commonly known as the cycle rank, cyclomatic number, or circuit rank of the graph. It is equal to the rank of the cographic matroid of the graph. It also equals the nullity of the Laplacian matrix of the graph, defined as L = D − A, where D is the diagonal matrix of vertex degrees; the Laplacian nullity equals the cycle rank because L = M M^{T} (M times its own transpose).

== See also ==
- Rank (graph theory)
