= Implication graph =

Directed graph representing a Boolean expression

An implication graph representing the 2-satisfiability instance $\scriptscriptstyle (x_0\lor x_2)\land(x_0\lor\lnot x_3)\land(x_1\lor\lnot x_3)\land(x_1\lor\lnot x_4)\land(x_2\lor\lnot x_4)\land{}\atop\quad\scriptscriptstyle(x_0\lor\lnot x_5)\land (x_1\lor\lnot x_5)\land (x_2\lor\lnot x_5)\land (x_3\lor x_6)\land (x_4\lor x_6)\land (x_5\lor x_6).$

In mathematical logic and graph theory, an implication graph is a skew-symmetric, directed graph G = (V, E) composed of vertex set V and directed edge set E. Each vertex in V represents the truth status of a Boolean literal, and each directed edge from vertex u to vertex v represents the material implication "If the literal u is true then the literal v is also true". Implication graphs were originally used for analyzing complex Boolean expressions.

== Applications ==
A 2-satisfiability instance in conjunctive normal form can be transformed into an implication graph by replacing each of its disjunctions by a pair of implications. For example, the statement $(x_0\lor x_1)$ can be rewritten as $(\neg x_0 \rightarrow x_1)$, but $(\neg x_1 \rightarrow x_0)$ also works. An instance is satisfiable if and only if no literal and its negation belong to the same strongly connected component of its implication graph; this characterization can be used to solve 2-satisfiability instances in linear time.

In CDCL SAT-solvers, unit propagation can be naturally associated with an implication graph that captures all possible ways of deriving all implied literals from decision literals, which is then used for clause learning.
