= Robert McNaughton =

American mathematician

Robert Forbes McNaughton, Jr. (March 13, 1924 – June 5, 2014) was an American mathematician, logician, and computer scientist with several key contributions in formal languages, grammars and rewriting systems, and word combinatorics.

McNaughton was originally from Brooklyn, and earned a bachelor's degree from Columbia University. He completed his Ph.D. at Harvard University; his dissertation, On Establishing the Consistency of Systems, was supervised by Willard Van Orman Quine. He taught at the University of Pennsylvania and then at the Rensselaer Polytechnic Institute.

He died in 2014 in Troy, New York.
