= S. Rao Kosaraju =

Indian-American computer scientist

- Education: Andhra University; IIT Kharagpur; University of Pennsylvania
- Known for: Kosaraju's algorithm
- Scientific career
- Fields: Computer science
- Doctoral advisor: Aravind Joshi; Hisao Yamada
- Doctoral students: Mikhail Atallah

Sambasiva Rao Kosaraju is an Indian-American professor of computer science at Johns Hopkins University, and division director for Computing & Communication Foundations at the National Science Foundation. He has done extensive work in the design and analysis of parallel and sequential algorithms.

== Education ==
He was born in India, and he did his bachelor's degree in engineering from Andhra University, Masters from IIT Kharagpur, and holds a PhD from University of Pennsylvania.

== Career ==
In 1978, he published a paper describing a method to efficiently compute the strongly connected components of a directed graph, a method later called Kosaraju's algorithm. Along with Paul Callahan, he published many articles on efficient algorithms for computing the well-separated pair decomposition of a point set. His research interests include efficient algorithms for pattern matching, data structure simulations, universal graphs, DNA sequence assembly, derandomization and investigations of immune system responses.

In 1995, he was inducted as a Fellow of the Association for Computing Machinery and is also a fellow of the IEEE.
