= List of graph theory topics =

This is a list of graph theory topics, by Wikipedia page.

See glossary of graph theory for basic terminology.

== Examples and types of graphs ==
- Amalgamation
- Bipartite graph
  - Complete bipartite graph
  - Disperser
  - Expander
  - Extractor
- Bivariegated graph
- Cage (graph theory)
- Cayley graph
- Circle graph
- Clique graph
- Cograph
- Common graph
- Complement of a graph
- Complete graph
- Cubic graph
- Cycle graph
- De Bruijn graph
- Dense graph
- Dipole graph
- Directed acyclic graph
- Directed graph
- Distance regular graph
- Distance-transitive graph
- Edge-transitive graph
- Interval graph
- Interval graph, improper
- Interval graph, proper
- Line graph
- Lollipop graph
- Minor
  - Robertson–Seymour theorem
- Pairwise compatibility graph
- Petersen graph
- Planar graph
  - Dual polyhedron
  - Outerplanar graph
- Random graph
- Regular graph
- Scale-free network
- Snark (graph theory)
- Sparse graph
  - Sparse graph code
- Split graph
- String graph
- Strongly regular graph
- Threshold graph
- Total graph
- Tree (graph theory).
- Trellis (graph)
- Turán graph
- Ultrahomogeneous graph
- Vertex-transitive graph
- Visibility graph
  - Museum guard problem
- Wheel graph

== Graph coloring ==
- Acyclic coloring
- Chromatic polynomial
- Cocoloring
- Complete coloring
- Edge coloring
- Exact coloring
- Four color theorem
- Fractional coloring
- Goldberg–Seymour conjecture
- Graph coloring game
- Graph two-coloring
- Harmonious coloring
- Incidence coloring
- List coloring
- List edge-coloring
- Perfect graph
- Ramsey's theorem
- Sperner's lemma
- Strong coloring
- Subcoloring
- Tait's conjecture
- Total coloring
- Uniquely colorable graph

== Paths and cycles ==
- Path (graph theory)
- Seven Bridges of Königsberg
  - Eulerian path
- Three-cottage problem
- Shortest path problem
  - Dijkstra's algorithm
    - Open Shortest Path First
- Flooding algorithm
- Route inspection problem
- Hamiltonian path
  - Hamiltonian path problem
  - Knight's tour
- Traveling salesman problem
  - Nearest neighbour algorithm
  - Bottleneck traveling salesman problem
- Path analysis (paths and cycles)

== Trees ==
- Abstract syntax tree
- B-tree
- Binary tree
  - Binary search tree
    - Self-balancing binary search tree
      - AVL tree
      - Red–black tree
      - Splay tree
      - T-tree
  - Binary space partitioning
  - Full binary tree
- B*-tree
- Heap
  - Binary heap
  - Binomial heap
  - Fibonacci heap
  - 2-3 heap
- Kd-tree
- Cover tree
- Decision tree
- Empty tree
- Evolutionary tree
- Exponential tree
- Family tree
- Fault tree
- Free tree
- Game tree
- K-ary tree
- Octree
- Parse tree
- Phylogenetic tree
- Polytree
- Positional tree
- PQ tree
- R-tree
- Rooted tree
  - Ordered tree
  - Recursive tree
- SPQR tree
- Suffix tree
- Technology tree
- Trie
  - Patricia trie
- Spanning tree
  - Minimum spanning tree
    - Boruvka's algorithm
    - Kruskal's algorithm
    - Prim's algorithm
- Steiner tree
- Quadtree

=== Terminology ===
- Node
  - Child node
  - Parent node
  - Leaf node
  - Root node
  - Root (graph theory)

=== Operations ===
- Tree rotation
- Tree traversal
  - Inorder traversal
  - Backward inorder traversal
  - Pre-order traversal
  - Post-order traversal
  - Ahnentafel
- Tree search algorithm
- A-star search algorithm
- Best-first search
- Breadth-first search
- Depth-first search
  - Iterative deepening depth-first search
- Tree structure
- Tree data structure
- Cayley's formula
- Kőnig's lemma
- Tree (set theory) (need not be a tree in the graph-theory sense, because there may not be a unique path between two vertices)
- Tree (descriptive set theory)
- Euler tour technique

== Graph limits ==
- Graphon

== Graphs in logic ==
- Conceptual graph
- Entitative graph
- Existential graph
- Laws of Form
- Logical graph

== Mazes and labyrinths ==
- Labyrinth
- Maze
- Maze generation algorithm

== Algorithms ==
- Ant colony algorithm
- Breadth-first search
- Depth-first search
- Depth-limited search
- FKT algorithm
- Flood fill
- Graph exploration algorithm
- Matching (graph theory)
- Max flow min cut theorem
- Maximum-cardinality search
- Shortest path
  - Dijkstra's algorithm
  - Bellman–Ford algorithm
  - A* algorithm
  - Floyd–Warshall algorithm
- Topological sorting
  - Pre-topological order

== Other topics ==
- Adjacency list
- Adjacency matrix
  - Adjacency algebra – the algebra of polynomials in the adjacency matrix
- Canadian traveller problem
- Cliques and independent sets
  - Clique problem
- Connected component
- Cycle space
- de Bruijn sequences
- Degree diameter problem
- Entanglement (graph measure)
- Erdős–Gyárfás conjecture
- Eternal dominating set
- Extremal graph theory
  - Critical graph
  - Turán's theorem
- Frequency partition
- Frucht's theorem
- Girth
- Graph drawing
- Graph homomorphism
- Graph labeling
  - Graceful labeling
- Graph partition
- Graph pebbling
- Graph property
- Graph reduction
- Graph-structured stack
- Graphical model
  - Bayesian network
  - D-separation
  - Markov random field
- Tree decomposition (Junction tree) and treewidth
- Graph triangulation (see also Chordal graph)
- Perfect order
- Hidden Markov model
  - Baum–Welch algorithm
  - Viterbi algorithm
- Incidence matrix
- Independent set problem
- Knowledge representation
  - Conceptual graph
  - Mind map
- Level structure
- Link popularity
- Mac Lane's planarity criterion
- Node influence metric
- Reconstruction conjecture
- Scientific classification
  - Cladistics
  - Neighbor-joining
  - Phenetics
- Turán number
- Shannon switching game
- Spectral graph theory
- Spring-based algorithm
- Strongly connected component
- Vertex cover problem

== Networks, network theory ==
See list of network theory topics

== Hypergraphs ==
- Helly family
- Intersection (Line) Graphs of hypergraphs
