= Graph coloring game =

Class of mathematical games

The vertex coloring game on a given graph between Alice and Bob. Here, vertices labeled "A" are colored by Alice, and "B" by Bob. The players take turns (starting with Alice) coloring properly vertices of the graph. If the graph is fully colored properly at the end, Alice wins. If at any point there is a vertex that becomes impossible to properly color, Bob wins. The game chromatic number $\chi_g(G)$ is the minimum number of colors needed for Alice to win the vertex coloring game on $G$. For this graph, $\chi_g(G)=3$, as it is the Cartesian product $S_5 \square P_2$

Unsolved problem in mathematics
Suppose Alice has a winning strategy for the vertex coloring game on a graph G with k colors. Does she have one for k+1 colors?
More unsolved problems in mathematics

The graph coloring game is a mathematical game related to graph theory. Coloring game problems arose as game-theoretic versions of well-known graph coloring problems. In a coloring game, two players use a given set of colors to construct a coloring of a graph, following specific rules depending on the game we consider. One player tries to successfully complete the coloring of the graph, while the other one tries to prevent him from achieving it.

== Vertex coloring game ==
The vertex coloring game was introduced in 1981 by Steven Brams as a map-coloring game and rediscovered ten years after by Bodlaender. Its rules are as follows:

1. Alice and Bob color the vertices of a graph G with a set k of colors.
2. Alice and Bob take turns, coloring properly an uncolored vertex (in the standard version, Alice begins).
3. If a vertex v is impossible to color properly (for any color, v has a neighbor colored with it), then Bob wins.
4. If the graph is completely colored, then Alice wins.

The game chromatic number of a graph $G$, denoted by $\chi_g(G)$, is the minimum number of colors needed for Alice to win the vertex coloring game on $G$. Trivially, for every graph $G$, we have $\chi(G) \le \chi_g(G) \le \Delta(G) + 1$, where $\chi(G)$ is the chromatic number of $G$ and $\Delta(G)$ its maximum degree.

In the 1991 Bodlaender's paper, the computational complexity was left as "an interesting open problem". Only in 2020 it was proved that the game is PSPACE-Complete.

=== Relation with other notions ===
Acyclic coloring. Every graph $G$ with acyclic chromatic number $k$ has $\chi_g(G) \le k(k+1)$.

Marking game. For every graph $G$, $\chi_g(G) \le col_g(G)$, where $col_g(G)$ is the game coloring number of $G$. Almost every known upper bound for the game chromatic number of graphs are obtained from bounds on the game coloring number.

Cycle-restrictions on edges. If every edge of a graph $G$ belongs to at most $c$ cycles, then $\chi_g(G) \le 4+c$.

=== Graph Classes ===
For a class ${\mathcal C}$ of graphs, we denote by $\chi_g({\mathcal C})$ the smallest integer $k$ such that every graph $G$ of ${\mathcal C}$ has $\chi_g(G) \le k$. In other words, $\chi_g({\mathcal C})$ is the exact upper bound for the game chromatic number of graphs in this class. This value is known for several standard graph classes, and bounded for some others:

- Forests: $\chi_g({\mathcal F}) = 4$. Simple criteria are known to determine the game chromatic number of a forest without vertex of degree 3. It seems difficult to determine the game chromatic number of forests with vertices of degree 3, even for forests with maximum degree 3.
- Cactuses: $\chi_g({\mathcal C}) = 5$.
- Outerplanar graphs: $6 \le \chi_g({\mathcal O}) \le 7$.
- Planar graphs: $7 \le \chi_g({\mathcal P}) \le 17$.
- Planar graphs of given girth: $\chi_g({\mathcal P}_4) \le 13$, $\chi_g({\mathcal P}_5) \le 8$, $\chi_g({\mathcal P}_6) \le 6$, $\chi_g({\mathcal P}_8) \le 5$.
- Toroidal grids: $\chi_g({\mathcal TG}) = 5$.
- Partial k-trees: $\chi_g({\mathcal T}_k) \le 3k+2$.
- Interval graphs: $2\omega \le \chi_g({\mathcal I}) \le 3\omega-2$, where $\omega$ is for a graph the size of its largest clique.

Cartesian products. The game chromatic number of the cartesian product $G \square H$ is not bounded by a function of $\chi_g(G)$ and $\chi_g(H)$. In particular, the game chromatic number of any complete bipartite graph $K_{n,n}$ is equal to 3, but there is no upper bound for $\chi_g(K_{n,n} \square K_{m,m})$ for arbitrary $n, m$. On the other hand, the game chromatic number of $G \square H$ is bounded above by a function of $\textrm{col}_g(G)$ and $\textrm{col}_g(H)$. In particular, if $\textrm{col}_g(G)$ and $\textrm{col}_g(H)$ are both at most $t$, then $\chi_g(G \square H) \le t^5 - t^3 + t^2$.

- For a single edge we have:

$$\begin{align}
\chi_g(K_2 \square P_k) &= \begin{cases} 2 & k = 1 \\ 3 & k=2,3 \\ 4 & k \ge 4 \end{cases} \\
\chi_g(K_2 \square C_k) &= 4 && k \ge 3 \\
\chi_g(K_2 \square K_k) &= k+1
\end{align}$$

- For stars we have:

$$\begin{align}
\chi_g(S_m \square P_k) &= \begin{cases} 2 & k = 1 \\ 3 & k=2 \\ 4 & k \ge 3 \end{cases} \\
\chi_g(S_m \square C_k) &= 4 && k \ge 3
\end{align}$$

- Trees: $\chi_g(T_1 \square T_2) \le 12.$
- Wheels: $\chi_g(P_2 \square W_n) = 5$ if $n \ge 9.$
- Complete bipartite graphs: $\chi_g(P_2 \square K_{m,n}) = 5$ if $m, n \ge 5.$

=== Open problems ===
These questions are still open to this date.

==== More colors for Alice ====
- Suppose Alice has a winning strategy for the vertex coloring game on a graph G with k colors. Does she have one for k+1 colors ?
  One would expect the answers to be "yes", as having more colors seems an advantage to Alice. However, no proof exists that this statement is true.
- Is there a function f such that, if Alice has a winning strategy for the vertex coloring game on a graph G with k colors, then Alice has a winning strategy on G with f(k) ?
  Relaxation of the previous question.

==== Relations with other notions ====
- Suppose a monotone class of graphs (i.e. a class of graphs closed by subgraphs) has bounded game chromatic number. Is it true that this class of graph has bounded game coloring number ?
- Suppose a monotone class of graphs (i.e. a class of graphs closed by subgraphs) has bounded game chromatic number. Is it true that this class of graph has bounded arboricity ?
- Is it true that a monotone class of graphs of bounded game chromatic number has bounded acyclic chromatic number ?

==== Reducing maximum degree ====
- Conjecture: Is $F$ is a forest, there exists $F' \subseteq F$ such that $\Delta(F') \le \chi_g(F)$ and $\chi_g(F') = \chi_g(F)$.
- Let ${\mathcal G}$ be the class of graphs such that for any $G \in {\mathcal G}$, there exists $G' \subseteq G$ such that $\Delta(G') \le \chi_g(G)$ and $\chi_g(G') = \chi_g(G)$. What families of graphs are in ${\mathcal G}$ ?

==== Hypercubes ====
- Is it true that $\chi_g(G) = n+1$ for any hypercube $Q_n$ ?
  It is known to be true for $n \le 4$.

== Edge coloring game ==
The edge coloring game, introduced by Lam, Shiu and Zu, is similar to the vertex coloring game, except Alice and Bob construct a proper edge coloring instead of a proper vertex coloring. Its rules are as follows:

1. Alice and Bob are coloring the edges a graph G with a set k of colors.
2. Alice and Bob are taking turns, coloring properly an uncolored edge (in the standard version, Alice begins).
3. If an edge e is impossible to color properly (for any color, e is adjacent to an edge colored with it), then Bob wins.
4. If the graph is completely edge-colored, then Alice wins.

Although this game can be considered as a particular case of the vertex coloring game on line graphs, it is mainly considered in the scientific literature as a distinct game. The game chromatic index of a graph $G$, denoted by $\chi'_g(G)$, is the minimum number of colors needed for Alice to win this game on $G$.

=== General case ===
For every graph G, $\chi'(G) \le \chi'_g(G) \le 2\Delta(G) -1$. There are graphs reaching these bounds but all the graphs we know reaching this upper bound have small maximum degree. There exists graphs with $\chi'_g(G) > 1.008\Delta(G)$ for arbitrary large values of $\Delta(G)$.

Conjecture. There is an $\epsilon > 0$ such that, for any arbitrary graph $G$, we have $\chi'_g(G) \le (2-\epsilon)\Delta(G)$.
This conjecture is true when $\Delta(G)$ is large enough compared to the number of vertices in $G$.

- Arboricity. Let $a(G)$ be the arboricity of a graph $G$. Every graph $G$ with maximum degree $\Delta(G)$ has $\chi'_g(G) \le \Delta(G) + 3a(G) - 1$.

=== Graph Classes ===
For a class ${\mathcal C}$ of graphs, we denote by $\chi'_g({\mathcal C})$ the smallest integer $k$ such that every graph $G$ of ${\mathcal C}$ has $\chi'_g(G) \le k$. In other words, $\chi'_g({\mathcal C})$ is the exact upper bound for the game chromatic index of graphs in this class. This value is known for several standard graph classes, and bounded for some others:

- Wheels: $\chi'_g(W_3) = 5$ and $\chi'_g(W_n) = n+1$ when $n\ge4$.
- Forests : $\chi'_g({\mathcal F}_\Delta) \le \Delta + 1$ when $\Delta \ne 4$, and $5 \le \chi'_g({\mathcal F}_4) \le 6$.
  Moreover, if every tree of a forest $F$ of ${\mathcal F}_4$ is obtained by subdivision from a caterpillar tree or contains no two adjacent vertices with degree 4, then $\chi'_g(F) \le 5$.

=== Open Problems ===
Upper bound. Is there a constant $c \ge 2$ such that $\chi'_g(G) \le \Delta(G) + c$ for each graph $G$ ? If it is true, is $c = 2$ enough ?

Conjecture on large minimum degrees. There are a $\epsilon > 0$ and an integer $d_0$ such that any graph $G$ with $\delta(G) \ge d_0$ satisfies $\chi'_g(G) \ge (1+\epsilon)\delta(G)$.

== Incidence coloring game ==
The incidence coloring game is a graph coloring game, introduced by Andres, and similar to the vertex coloring game, except Alice and Bob construct a proper incidence coloring instead of a proper vertex coloring. Its rules are as follows:

1. Alice and Bob are coloring the incidences of a graph G with a set k of colors.
2. Alice and Bob are taking turns, coloring properly an uncolored incidence (in the standard version, Alice begins).
3. If an incidence i is impossible to color properly (for any color, i is adjacent to an incident colored with it), then Bob wins.
4. If all the incidences are properly colored, then Alice wins.

The incidence game chromatic number of a graph $G$, denoted by $i_g(G)$, is the minimum number of colors needed for Alice to win this game on $G$.

For every graph $G$ with maximum degree $\Delta$, we have $\frac{3\Delta - 1}{2} < i_g(G) < 3\Delta - 1$.

=== Relations with other notions ===
- (a,d)-Decomposition. This is the best upper bound we know for the general case. If the edges of a graph $G$ can be partitioned into two sets, one of them inducing a graph with arboricity $a$, the second inducing a graph with maximum degree $d$, then $i_g(G) \le \left\lfloor \frac{3\Delta(G) - a}{2} \right\rfloor + 8a + 3d - 1$.
  If moreover $\Delta(G) \ge 5a + 6d$, then $i_g(G) \le \left\lfloor \frac{3\Delta(G) - a}{2} \right\rfloor + 8a + d - 1$.
- Degeneracy. If $G$ is a k-degenerated graph with maximum degree $\Delta(G)$, then $i_g(G) \le 2\Delta(G) + 4k - 2$. Moreover, $i_g(G) \le 2\Delta(G) + 3k - 1$ when $\Delta(G) \ge 5k - 1$ and $i_g(G) \le \Delta(G) + 8k - 2$ when $\Delta(G) \le 5k -1$.

=== Graph Classes ===
For a class ${\mathcal C}$ of graphs, we denote by $i_g({\mathcal C})$ the smallest integer $k$ such that every graph $G$ of ${\mathcal C}$ has $i_g(G) \le k$.

- Paths : For $k \ge 13$, $i_g(P_k) = 5$.
- Cycles : For $k \ge 3$, $i_g(C_k) = 5$.
- Stars : For $k \ge 1$, $i_g(S_{2k}) = 3k$.
- Wheels : For $k \ge 6$, $i_g(W_{2k+1}) = 3k + 2$. For $k \ge 7$, $i_g(W_{2k}) = 3k$.
- Subgraphs of Wheels : For $k \ge 13$, if $G$ is a subgraph of $W_k$ having $S_k$ as a subgraph, then $i_g(G) = \left\lceil \frac{3k}{2} \right\rceil$.

=== Open Problems ===
- Is the upper bound $i_g(G) < 3\Delta(G) - 1$ tight for every value of $\Delta(G)$ ?
- Is the incidence game chromatic number a monotonic parameter (i.e. is it as least as big for a graph G as for any subgraph of G) ?

== References (chronological order) ==
- Gardner, Martin (1981). "Mathematical Games". Scientific American. Vol. 23.
- Bodlaender, Hans L. (1991). "On the complexity of some coloring games". Graph-Theoretic Concepts in Computer Science. Lecture Notes in Computer Science. Vol. 484. pp. 30–40. CiteSeerX 10.1.1.18.9992. doi:10.1007/3-540-53832-1_29. ISBN 978-3-540-53832-5.
- Faigle, Ulrich; Kern, Walter; Kierstead, Henry A.; Trotter, William T. (1993). "On the Game Chromatic Number of some Classes of Graphs" (PDF). Ars Combinatoria. 35 (17): 143–150. Archived (PDF) from the original on 2014-06-06.
- Kierstead, Henry A.; Trotter, William T. (1994). "Planar Graph Coloring with an Uncooperative Partner" (PDF). Journal of Graph Theory. 18 (6): 564–584. doi:10.1002/jgt.3190180605. Archived (PDF) from the original on 2014-07-14.
- Dinski, Thomas; Zhu, Xuding (1999). "A bound for the game chromatic number of graphs". Discrete Mathematics. 196 (1–3): 109–115. doi:10.1016/s0012-365x(98)00197-6.
- Guan, D. J.; Zhu, Xuding (1999). "Game chromatic number of outerplanar graphs". Journal of Graph Theory. 30 (1): 67–70. doi:10.1002/(sici)1097-0118(199901)30:1<67::aid-jgt7>3.0.co;2-m.
- Lam, Peter C. B.; Shiu, Wai C.; Xu, Baogang (1999). "Edge game coloring of graphs" (PDF). Graph Theory Notes N.Y. 37: 17–19. Archived (PDF) from the original on 2016-03-03.
- Zhu, Xuding (1999). "The Game Coloring Number of Planar Graphs". Journal of Combinatorial Theory, Series B. 75 (2): 245–258. doi:10.1006/jctb.1998.1878.
- Kierstead, Henry A. (2000). "A Simple Competitive Graph Coloring Algorithm". Journal of Combinatorial Theory, Series B. 78 (1): 57–68. doi:10.1006/jctb.1999.1927.
- Zhu, Xuding (2000). "The game coloring number of pseudo partial k-trees". Discrete Mathematics. 215 (1–3): 245–262. doi:10.1016/s0012-365x(99)00237-x.
- Cai, Leizhen; Zhu, Xuding (2001). "Game Chromatic Index of k-Degenerate Graphs". Journal of Graph Theory. 36 (3): 144–155. doi:10.1002/1097-0118(200103)36:3<144::aid-jgt1002>3.0.co;2-f.
- He, Wenjie; Hou, Xiaoling; Lih, Ko-Wei; Shao, Jiating; Wang, Weifan; Zhu, Xuding (2002). "Edge-partitions of planar graphs and their game coloring numbers". Journal of Graph Theory. 41 (4): 307–311. doi:10.1002/jgt.10069. S2CID 20929383.
- Erdös, Peter L.; Faigle, Ulrich; Hochstättler, Winfried; Kern, Walter (2004). "Note on the game chromatic index of trees". Theoretical Computer Science. 313 (3): 371–376. doi:10.1016/j.tcs.2002.10.002.
- Andres, Stephan D. (2006). "The game chromatic index of forests of maximum degree Δ ⩾ 5". Discrete Applied Mathematics. 154 (9): 1317–1323. doi:10.1016/j.dam.2005.05.031.
- Bartnicki, Tomasz; Grytczuk, Jaroslaw; Kierstead, H. A.; Zhu, Xuding (2007). "The Map-Coloring Game" (PDF). American Mathematical Monthly. 114 (9): 793–803. doi:10.1080/00029890.2007.11920471. JSTOR 27642332. S2CID 15901267. Archived (PDF) from the original on 2014-07-14.
- Peterin, Iztok (2007). "Game chromatic number of Cartesian product graphs". Electronic Notes in Discrete Mathematics. 29: 353–357. CiteSeerX 10.1.1.107.111. doi:10.1016/j.endm.2007.07.060.
- Sidorowicz, Elżbieta (2007). "The game chromatic number and the game colouring number of cactuses". Information Processing Letters. 102 (4): 147–151. doi:10.1016/j.ipl.2006.12.003.
- Bartnicki, Tomasz; Grytczuk, Jarosław (2008). "A Note on the Game Chromatic Index of Graphs". Graphs and Combinatorics. 24 (2): 67–70. doi:10.1007/s00373-008-0774-z. S2CID 19373685.
- Beveridge, Andrew; Bohman, Tom; Friezeb, Alan; Pikhurko, Oleg (2008). "Game chromatic index of graphs with given restrictions on degrees". Theoretical Computer Science. 407 (1–3): 242–249. doi:10.1016/j.tcs.2008.05.026.
- Zhu, Xuding (2008). "Refined activation strategy for the marking game". Journal of Combinatorial Theory, Series B. 98 (1): 1–18. doi:10.1016/j.jctb.2007.04.004.
- Andres, Stefan D. (2009). "The incidence game chromatic number". Discrete Applied Mathematics. 157 (9): 1980–1987. doi:10.1016/j.dam.2007.10.021.
- Andres, Stefan D. (2009). "Erratum to: The incidence game chromatic number". Discrete Applied Mathematics. 158 (6): 728. doi:10.1016/j.dam.2009.11.017.
- Raspaud, André; Wu, Jiaojiao (2009). "Game chromatic number of toroidal grids". Information Processing Letters. 109 (21–22): 1183–1186. doi:10.1016/j.ipl.2009.08.001.
- Sia, Charmaine (2009). "The Game Chromatic Number of Some Families of Cartesian Product Graphs" (PDF). AKCE International Journal of Graphs and Combinatorics. 6 (2): 315–327. Archived from the original (PDF) on 2011-11-14.
- Junosza-Szaniawski, Konstanty; Rożej, Łukasz (2010). "Game chromatic number of graphs with locally bounded number of cycles". Information Processing Letters. 110 (17): 757–760. doi:10.1016/j.ipl.2010.06.004.
- Kim, John Y. (2011). "The incidence game chromatic number of paths and subgraphs of wheels". Discrete Applied Mathematics. 159 (8): 683–694. doi:10.1016/j.dam.2010.01.001.
- Charpentier, Clément; Sopena, Éric (2013). "Incidence Coloring Game and Arboricity of Graphs". Combinatorial Algorithms. Lecture Notes in Computer Science. Vol. 8288. pp. 106–114. arXiv:1304.0166. doi:10.1007/978-3-642-45278-9_10. ISBN 978-3-642-45277-2. S2CID 14707501.
- Chan, Wai H.; Nong, Ge (2014). "The game chromatic index of some trees of maximum degree 4". Discrete Applied Mathematics. 170: 1–6. doi:10.1016/j.dam.2014.01.003.
- Sekigushi, Yosuke (2014). "The game coloring number of planar graphs with a given girth". Discrete Mathematics. 300: 11–16. doi:10.1016/j.disc.2014.04.011.
- Charpentier, Clément; Sopena, Éric (2014). "The incidence game chromatic number of (a,d)-decomposable graphs". Journal of Discrete Algorithms. 31: 14–25. doi:10.1016/j.jda.2014.10.001. S2CID 1102795.
- Dunn, Charles; Larsen, Victor; Lindke, Kira; Retter, Troy; Toci, Dustin (2014). "The game chromatic number of trees and forests". arXiv:1410.5223 [math.CO].
- Costa, Eurinardo; Pessoa, Victor Lage; Soares, Ronan; Sampaio, Rudini (2020). "PSPACE-completeness of two graph coloring games". Theoretical Computer Science. 824–825: 36–45. doi:10.1016/j.tcs.2020.03.022. S2CID 218777459.
- Bradshaw, Peter (2021). "Graph colorings with restricted bicolored subgraphs: II. The graph coloring game". Journal of Graph Theory. 100 (2): 371–383. arXiv:2008.13275. doi:10.1002/jgt.22786. S2CID 221377336.
