= Nash-Williams =

Nash-Williams is a Welsh surname. It may refer to:

- Crispin Nash-Williams (1932–2001), mathematician
- Victor Erle Nash-Williams (1897–1955), archeologist

== Others ==
- Nash-Williams theorem of graph theory

== See also ==
- Nash (surname)
- Williams (surname)
