= Vasanti N. Bhat-Nayak =

Indian mathematician (1938–2009)

- Born: 10 June 1938 in India
- Died: 12 February 2009 (aged 70 years) in Chembur, Mumbai
- Education: 1970 Ph.D. from the University of Mumbai
- Occupation: Mathematician

Vasanti N. Bhat-Nayak (10 June 1938 – 12 February 2009) was a mathematician whose research concerned balanced incomplete block designs, bivariegated graphs, graceful graphs, graph equations and frequency partitions. She earned a Ph.D. from the University of Mumbai in 1970 with the dissertation Some New Results in PBIBD Designs and Combinatorics. S. S. Shrikhande was her advisor.

After completing her doctorate, she remained on the faculty at the university, and eventually served as department head. She had 44 publications in the field of Combinatorics.
