= S. B. Rao =

Indian mathematician (born 1943)

Siddani Bhaskara Rao
- Born: 1943 (age 82–83); India
- Citizenship: Indian
- Education: Andhra University Indian Statistical Institute
- Occupation: Professor of Mathematics
- Known for: Frequency partition, Line graphs, Degree sequences
- Scientific career
- Fields: Graph Theory
- Workplaces: Indian Statistical Institute, University of Mumbai, Kings College, Aberdeen, Ohio State University
- Doctoral advisor: C. R. Rao

Siddani Bhaskara Rao is a graph theorist, Professor Emeritus, and director of the Indian Statistical Institute (ISI) in Calcutta. Rao is the first director of the CR Rao Advanced Institute of Mathematics, Statistics and Computer Science. S. B. Rao is known for his work on line graphs, frequency partitions and degree sequences.

Rao hails from Andhra Pradesh and completed his M.A. (1965) in mathematics from Andhra University. He received his Ph.D. (1971) from the Indian Statistical Institute, Calcutta under the supervision of renowned Statistician CR Rao. After completing his Ph.D., he moved to the University of Mumbai to work with S. S. Shrikhande. At the same time, he visited King's College, Aberdeen to work with Crispin St. J. A. Nash-Williams. From the University of Mumbai, Rao went back to the Indian Statistical Institute (ISI). While at ISI, he visited Ohio State University. Rao has guided students for their Ph.D.s in graph theory. He was the director of ISI Calcutta from 1995 to 2000. After retirement from ISI, he went to University of Hyderabad to work as the first director of the C. R. Rao Advanced Institute of Mathematics, Statistics and Computer Science, Hyderabad.
