= Incidence coloring =

Special labeling in graph theory

In graph theory, the act of coloring generally implies the assignment of labels to vertices, edges or faces in a graph. The incidence coloring is a special graph labeling where each incidence of an edge with a vertex is assigned a color under certain constraints.

== Definitions ==
Below G denotes a simple graph with non-empty vertex set (non-empty) V(G), edge set E(G) and maximum degree Δ(G).

Definition. An incidence is defined as a pair (v, e) where $v\in V(G)$ is an end point of $e\in E(G).$ In simple words, one says that vertex v is incident to edge e. Two incidences (v, e) and (u, f) are said to be adjacent or neighboring if one of the following holds:

- v = u, e ≠ f
- e = f, v ≠ u
- e = {v, u}, f = {u, w} and v ≠ w.

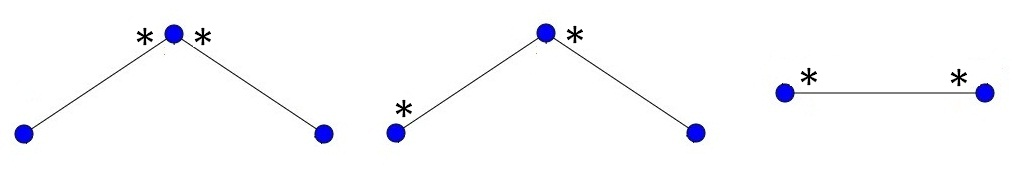
Examples of adjacent/neighboring incidences. The * above the edge e closest to vertex v denotes incidence (v,e).

Definition. Let I(G) be the set of all incidences of G. An incidence coloring of G is a function $c: I(G)\to\N$ that takes distinct values on adjacent incidences (we use the simplified notation c(v, u) is used instead of c((v, e)).) The minimum number of colors needed for the incidence coloring of a graph G is known as the incidence chromatic number or incidence coloring number of G, represented by $\chi_i(G).$ This notation was introduced by Jennifer J. Quinn Massey and Richard A. Brualdi in 1993.

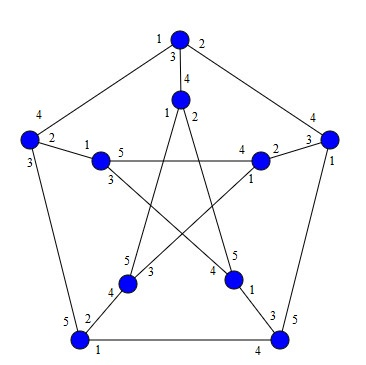
Incidence coloring of a Petersen graph

== History ==
The concept of incidence coloring was introduced by Brualdi and Massey in 1993 who bounded it in terms of Δ(G). Initially, the incidence chromatic number of trees, complete bipartite graphs and complete graphs was found out. They also conjectured that all graphs can have an incidence coloring using Δ(G) + 2 colors (Incidence coloring conjecture - ICC). This conjecture was disproved by Guiduli, who showed that incidence coloring concept is a directed star arboricity case, introduced by Alon and Algor. His counter example showed that incidence chromatic number is at most Δ(G) + O(log Δ(G)).

Chen et al. found the incidence chromatic number of paths, fans, cycles, wheels, complete tripartite graph and adding edge wheels. Few years later, Shiu et al. showed that this conjecture is true for certain cubic graphs such as cubic Hamiltonian graphs. He showed that in case of outerplanar graph of maximum degree 4, the incidence chromatic number is not 5. The bounds for incidence chromatic number of various graph classes is found out now.

== Basic results ==
Proposition. $\chi_i(G) \ge \Delta(G)+1.$

Proof. Let v be the vertex with maximum degree Δ in G. Let $e_1, e_2,\ldots, e_\Delta$ be the edges that are incident with the vertex v. Consider $e_1 =\{v, w\}.$ We can see that every pair of Δ + 1 incidences, that is, $(v,e_1), (v,e_2), \ldots, (v, e_\Delta), (w, e_1)$ is neighborly. Therefore, these incidences have to be colored using distinct colors.

The bound is attained by trees and complete graphs:

- If G is a complete graph with at least two vertices then $\chi_i(G)=\Delta(G)+1.$
- If G is a tree with at least two vertices then $\chi_i(G)=\Delta(G)+1.$

The main results were proved by Brualdi and Massey (1993). Shiu, Sun and Wu have proposed certain necessary conditions for graph satisfying $\chi_i(G)=\Delta(G)+1.$

- $\chi_i(G) \le 2\Delta(G).$
- The incidence chromatic number of the complete bipartite graph $K_{m,n}$ with m ≥ n ≥ 2, is m + 2.
- $\chi_i(C_n) \le 4$ and $\chi_i(C_{3n})= 3.$

== Incidence coloring of some graph classes ==
=== Meshes ===
Several algorithms are introduced to provide incidence coloring of meshes like square meshes, honeycomb meshes and hexagonal meshes. These algorithms are optimal. For each mesh, the incidence colors can be made in the linear time with the fewest colors. It is found out that ∆(G) + 1 colors are required for incidence coloring of square meshes, honeycomb meshes and hexagonal meshes.

- The incidence chromatic number of a square mesh is 5.
- The incidence chromatic number of a hexagonal mesh is 7.
- The incidence chromatic number of a honeycomb mesh is 4.

=== Halin graphs ===
Chen, Wang and Pang proved that if G is a Halin graph with ∆(G) > 4 then $\chi_i(G) =\Delta(G)+1.$ For Halin graphs with ∆(G) = 3 or 4, Jing-Zhe Qu showed $\chi_i(G)$ to be 5 or 6 respectively. Whether the incidence coloring number of Halin graphs with low degree is Δ(G) + 1 is still an unsolved problem.

Shiu and Sun proved every cubic Halin graph other than $K_4$ has an incidence coloring with Δ(G) + 2 colors. Su, Meng and Guo extended this result to all pseudo-Halin graphs.

If the Halin graph G contains a tree T, then $\chi_i(G^2) \le \Delta(T^2) +\Delta(T) +8.$

=== k-degenerated graphs ===
D.L. Chen, P.C.B. Lam and W.C. Shiu had conjectured that the incidence chromatic number of a cubic graph G is at most ∆(G) + 2. They proved this for certain cubic graphs such as Hamiltonian cubic graphs. Based on these results, M. H. Dolama, E. Sopena and X. Zhu (2004) studied the graph classes for which $\chi_i(G)$ is bounded by ∆(G) + c where c is some fixed constant. A graph is said to be k-generated if for every subgraph H of G, the minimum degree of H is at most k.

- Incidence chromatic number of k-degenerated graphs G is at most ∆(G) + 2k − 1.
- Incidence chromatic number of K_{4} minor free graphs G is at most ∆(G) + 2 and it forms a tight bound.
- Incidence chromatic number of a planar graph G is at most ∆(G) + 7.

=== Outerplanar graphs ===
Consider an outerplanar graph G with cut vertex v such that G – v is the union of $H_1$ and $H_2$. Let $G_1$ (resp. $G_2$) be the induced subgraph on vertex v and vertices of $H_1$ (resp. $H_2$). Then $\chi_i(G)$ is the maximum of $\chi_i(G_1), \chi_i(G_2)$ and $1+d_G(v)$ where $d_G(v)$ is the degree of vertex v in G.

The incidence chromatic number of an outerplanar graph G is at most ∆(G) + 2. In case of outerplanar graphs with ∆(G) > 3 the incidence chromatic number is ∆(G) + 1.

Since outerplanar graphs are K_{4}-minor-free graphs, they accept a (Δ + 2, 2)–incidence coloring. The solution for incidence chromatic number of the outerplanar graph G having Δ(G) = 3 and 2-connected outerplanar graph is still an open question.

=== Chordal rings ===
Chordal rings are variations of ring networks. The use of chordal rings in communication is very extensive due to its advantages over the interconnection networks with ring topology and other analysed structures such as meshes, hypercubes, Cayley's graphs, etc. Arden and Lee first proposed the chordal ring of degree 3, that is, the ring structured network in which every node has an extra link known as chord, to some other node in the network. Distributed loop networks are chordal rings of degree 4 which is constructed by adding 2 extra chords at every vertex in a ring network.

The chordal ring on N nodes and chord length d, denoted by CR(N,d), is a graph defined as:

$$\begin{align}
V(G)&=\{v_0, v_1, \ldots, v_{N-1}\} \\
E(G)&= \{ v_iv_j : i-j \equiv 1,d \bmod N\}
\end{align}$$

These graphs are studied due to their application in communication. Kung-Fu Ding, Kung-Jui Pai and Ro-Yu Wu studied the incidence coloring of chordal rings. Several algorithms are formulated to find the incidence chromatic number of chordal rings. The major findings are:

$$\begin{align}
\chi_i(CR(N,2)) &= \begin{cases} 5 & 5|N \\ 6 & \text{otherwise} \end{cases} \\
\chi_i(CR(N,3)) &= \begin{cases} 5 & 5|N \\ 6 & N \equiv 2 \bmod 5\end{cases}
\end{align}$$

=== Powers of cycles ===
Keaitsuda Nakprasit and Kittikorn Nakprasit studied the incidence coloring of powers of cycles, $C_n^k.$ If 2k + 1 ≥ n then $C_n^k = K_n$ so assume n > 2k + 1 and write:

$$n = (2k+1)t + r, \quad 1 \leq t, \quad 0 \leq r \leq 2k.$$

Their results can be summarized as follows:

$$\begin{align}
\chi_i(C_n^k) &= \begin{cases} 2k+1 & r =0 \\ 2k+2 & 1 \leq r \leq t \text{ or } r =2k\end{cases} && k \geq 3 \\
\chi_i(C_n^2) &= \begin{cases} 5 & 5|n \\ 6 & \text{otherwise} \end{cases}
\end{align}$$

The relation to incidence coloring conjecture is given by the observation that $\Delta(C_n^k) = 2k.$

== Relation between incidence chromatic number and domination number of a graph ==
Proposition. Let G be a simple connected graph of order n, size m and domination number $\gamma.$ Then $\chi_i(G) \ge \tfrac{2m}{n-\gamma}.$

Proof. Form a digraph D(G) from graph G by dividing each edge of G into 2 arcs in opposite directions. We can see that the total number of arcs in D(G) is 2m. According to Guiduli, the incidence coloring of G is equivalent to proper coloring of the digraph D(G), where 2 distinct arcs $\overrightarrow{u v}$ and $\overrightarrow{x y}$ are adjacent if one of the following conditions holds: (i) u = x; (ii) v = x or y = u. By the definition of adjacency of arcs, an independent set of arcs in D(G) is a star forest. Therefore, a maximal independent set of arcs is a maximal star forest. This implies that at least $\tfrac{2m}{n-\gamma}$ color classes are required.

This relation has been widely used in the characterization of (r + 1)-incidence colorable r-regular graphs. The major result on incidence coloring of r-regular graphs is: If graph G is r-regular graph, then $\chi_{i}(G) = \chi_{i}(G^2)=r+1$ if and only if V(G) is a disjoint union of r + 1 dominating sets.

== Interval incidence coloring ==
Definition. A finite subset $A\subset\N$ is an interval if and only if it contains all the numbers between its minimum and its maximum.

Definition. Let c to be an incidence coloring of G and define

$$A_c (v) = \{c(v,e) : (v,e) \in I(G) \}.$$

An interval incidence coloring of G is an incidence coloring c such that for each vertex v of G the set $A_c(v)$ is an interval. The interval incidence coloring number of G is the minimum number of colors used for the interval incidence coloring of G. It is denoted by $\chi_{ii}.$ It is clear that $\chi_{i}(G) \le \chi_{ii}(G).$ If only $\chi_{ii}$ colors are used for the interval incidence coloring, then it is said to be minimal.

The concept of interval incidence coloring was introduced by A. Malafiejska, R. Janczewski and M. Malafiejski. They proved $\chi_{ii}(G) \le \Delta(G)$ for bipartite graphs. In case of regular bipartite graphs equality holds. Subcubic bipartite graphs admit an interval incidence coloring using four, five or six colors. They have also proved incidence 5-colorability can be decided in linear time for bipartite graphs with ∆(G) = 4.

== Fractional incidence coloring ==
The fractional version of the incidence coloring was first introduced by Yang in 2007. An r-tuple incidence k-coloring of a graph G is the assignment of r colors to each incidence of graph G from a set of k colors such that the adjacent incidences are given disjoint sets of colors. By definition, it is obvious that 1-tuple incidence k-coloring is an incidence k-coloring too.

The fractional incidence chromatic number of graph G is the infimum of the fractions $\tfrac{k}{r}$ in such a way that G admits a r-tuple incidence k-coloring. Fractional incidence coloring has great applications in several fields of computer science. Based on incidence coloring results by Guiduli, Yang has proved that the fractional incidence chromatic number of any graph is at most Δ(G) + 20 log Δ(G) + 84. He has also proved the existence of graphs with fractional incidence chromatic number at least Δ(G) + Ω(log Δ(G)).

== Nordhaus–Gaddum inequality ==
Let G be a graph with n vertices such that $G\neq K_n, \overline{K_n}$ where $\overline{G}$ denotes the complement of G. Then $n + 2 \leq \chi_i(G) + \chi_{i}(\overline{G})\leq 2n-1.$ These bounds are sharp for all values of n.

== Incidence coloring game ==
Incidence coloring game was first introduced by S. D. Andres. It is the incidence version of the vertex coloring game, in which the incidences of a graph are colored instead of vertices. Incidence game chromatic number is the new parameter defined as a game-theoretic analogous of the incidence chromatic number.

The game is that two players, Alice and Bob construct a proper incidence coloring. The rules are stated below:

- Alice and Bob color the incidences of a graph G with a set k of colors.
- They are taking turns to provide a proper coloring to an uncolored incidence. Generally, Alice begins.
- In the case of an incidence that cannot be colored properly, then Bob wins.
- If every incidences of the graph is colored properly, Alice wins.

The incidence game chromatic number of a graph G, denoted by $i_g(G)$, is the fewest colors required for Alice to win in an incidence coloring game. It unifies the ideas of incidence chromatic number of a graph and game chromatic number in case of an undirected graph. Andres found out that the upper bound for $i_g(G)$ in case of k-degenerate graphs is 2Δ + 4k − 2. This bound was improved to 2Δ + 3k − 1 in case of graphs in which Δ is at least 5k. The incidence game chromatic number of stars, cycles, and sufficiently large wheels are also determined. John Y. Kim (2011) has found out the exact incidence game chromatic number of large paths and has given a correct proof of a result stated by Andres concerning the exact incidence game chromatic number of large wheels.

== Additional links ==
- Maydanskiy, M. (2005), "The incidence coloring conjecture for graphs of maximum degree 3", Discrete Mathematics, vol. 292, pp. 131–141.
- Hartke, S.G.; Helleloid, G.T. (2012), "Reconstructing a graph from its arc incidence graph", Graphs and Combinatorics, vol. 28, pp. 637–652, doi:10.1007/s00373-011-1073-7, S2CID 14656326.
- Sun, P. K.; Shiu, W. C. (2012), "Invalid proofs on incidence coloring" (PDF), Discrete Mathematics, vol. 54, pp. 107–114.
- Li, D; Liu, M. (2008), "Incidence coloring of the squares of some graphs", Discrete Mathematics, vol. 308, pp. 6575–6580.
- Bonamy, M.; Hocquard, H.; Kerdjoudj, S.; Raspaud, A. (2015), Incidence coloring of graphs with high maximum average degree, arXiv:1412.6803, Bibcode:2014arXiv1412.6803B.
- Hosseini Dolama, M.; Sopena, E. (2005), "On the maximum average degree and the incidence chromatic number of a graph" (PDF), Discrete Mathematics and Theoretical Computer Science, vol. 7, pp. 203–216.
- Shiu, W.C.; Lam, P.C.P.; Chen, D.L. (2002), "On incidence coloring for some cubic graphs", Discrete Mathematics, vol. 252, pp. 259–266, doi:10.1016/S0012-365X(01)00457-5, archived from the original on 2019-04-30.
- Nakprasit, K. (2014), "The strong chromatic index of graphs and subdivisions", Discrete Mathematics, vol. 317, pp. 75–78.
- Ding, K. F.; Pai, K. J; Chang, J. M.; Tsaur, R. (2015), "Some results of incidence coloring of generalized Petersen graphs", Intelligent Systems and Applications: Proceedings of the International Computer Symposium (ICS) held at Taichung, Taiwan, December 12 14, 2014, Frontiers in Artificial Intelligence and Applications, vol. 274, IOS Press, pp. 85–91, doi:10.3233/978-1-61499-484-8-85.
- Liang, L.; Gao, W. (2010), "On fractional incidence chromatic number of generalized theta-graph", Journal of Chongqing Normal University, vol. 27, pp. 36–39, archived from the original on 2016-03-04.
- Shiu, W. C.; Lam, P. C. B.; Chen, D. L. (2002), "Note on incidence coloring for some cubic graphs", Discrete Mathematics, vol. 252, pp. 259–266.
- Sun, P. K.; Shiu, W. C. (2012), "Some results on incidence coloring, star arboricity and domination number" (PDF), Australasian Journal of Combinitorics, vol. 54, pp. 107–114.
- Wu, J. (2009), "Some results on the incidence coloring number of a graph", Discrete Mathematics, vol. 309, pp. 3866–3870.
- Li, X.; Tu, J. (2008), "NP-completeness of 4-incidence colorability of semi-cubic graphs", Discrete Mathematics, vol. 308, pp. 1334–1340.
- Pai, K.J.; Chang, J.M.; Wu, R.Y. (2014), "Incidence coloring on hypercubes", Theoretical Computer Science, vol. 557, pp. 59–65.
- Pai, K.J.; Chang, J.M.; Wu, R.Y. (2014), "On the Incidence Coloring Number of Folded hypercubes", Proceedings of the 18th International Computer Science and Engineering Conference (ICSEC 2014), July 30 - August 1, Khon Kaen, Thailand, pp. 7–11.
- Sopena, É.; Wu, J (2013), "The incidence chromatic number of toroidal grids", Discussiones Mathematicae Graph Theory, 33 (2): 315–327, arXiv:0907.3801, doi:10.7151/dmgt.1663, S2CID 1313615.
- Andres, S. D. (2009). "Erratum to: The incidence game chromatic number". Discrete Applied Mathematics. 158 (6): 728. doi:10.1016/j.dam.2009.11.017.
- Charpentier, C.; Sopena, É. (2015), "The incidence game chromatic number of (a,d)- decomposable graphs", Journal of Discrete Algorithms, vol. 31, pp. 14–25.
- Wu, J.; Zhu, X. (2008), "The 6-relaxed game chromatic number of outerplanar graphs", Discrete Mathematics, 308 (24): 5974–5980, doi:10.1016/j.disc.2007.11.015.
- Meng, X.; Guo, J.; Su, B. (2012), "Incidence coloring of pseudo Halin graphs", Discrete Mathematics, 312 (22): 3276–3282, doi:10.1016/j.disc.2012.07.024.
- Andres, S. D. (2009), "Lightness of digraphs in surfaces and directed game chromatic number", Discrete Mathematics, vol. 309, pp. 3564–3579.
- Li, X.; Tu, J. (2008), "NP-completeness of 4-incidence colorability of semi-cubic graphs", Discrete Mathematics, 308 (7): 1334–1340, arXiv:math/0607071, doi:10.1016/j.disc.2007.03.076, S2CID 59464.
- Zhu, X. (1999), "The Game Coloring Number of Planar Graphs", Journal of Combinatorial Theory, Series B, 75 (2): 245–258, doi:10.1006/jctb.1998.1878.
- Liu, X.; Li, Y. (2005), "The incidence chromatic number of some graph", International Journal of Mathematics and Mathematical Sciences, 1 (5): 803–813, doi:10.1155/IJMMS.2005.803.
- Dong, G.X.; Liu, X.F. (2014), "Incidence Coloring Number of Some Join Graphs", Applied Mechanics and Materials, 602–605: 3185–3188, doi:10.4028/www.scientific.net/AMM.602-605.3185, S2CID 122567953.

== See also ==
- L(h, k)-coloring
- Harmonious coloring
- Star coloring
- Total coloring
- Circular coloring
- Path coloring
- Defective coloring
- Radio coloring
- Acyclic coloring
