= S. A. Choudum =

- Born: 1947 (age 78–79); India
- Citizenship: Indian
- Education: Karnataka University; IIT Madras
- Occupation: Professor of Mathematics
- Known for: Graph enumeration, Degree sequence, Graph coloring, Bivariegated graph, Interconnection networks
- Scientific career
- Fields: Graph Theory
- Workplaces: IIT Madras, University of Mumbai, Madurai Kamaraj University, University of Reading, Unisys, Tata Burroughs
- Doctoral advisor: K. R. Parthasarathy

Sheshayya A. Choudum (born 1947) was a professor and a former chair of the department of mathematics at IIT Madras. He has often worked in chromatic numbers, degree sequences, graph enumeration, and bivariegated graphs.

Choudum hails from Manvi, Raichur district, Karnataka. He completed a M.Sc., in Mathematics from Karnataka University, Dharwar and a Ph.D. in 1975 from IIT Madras. From there, he came to the Department of Mathematics University of Mumbai. Prior to joining the Computer Science Department at IIT Madras, he was with the Department of Mathematics of Madurai Kamaraj University. While at Madurai, he visited the University of Reading to work with Crispin Nash-Williams. Choudum has guided 10 Ph.D. students in graph theory.

== Books ==
- A First Course in Graph Theory by S.A. Choudum Macmillan, 1999 ISBN 0-333-92040-6
- Graph Theory, by S.A. Choudum, NPTEL (IITM), India, 2011.
