= Anthony Hilton =

British mathematician

Anthony J. W. Hilton (born 4 April 1941) is a British mathematician specializing in combinatorics and graph theory. His current positions are as emeritus professor of Combinatorial Mathematics at the University of Reading and professorial research fellow at Queen Mary College, University of London.

== Education ==
From 1951 to 1959, he attended the Bedford School in Bedford, Bedfordshire, England. From there he attended Reading University, where he earned a bachelor's degree in 1963 and was awarded a PhD in 1967. His dissertation was "Representation Theorems for Integers and Real Numbers" under his advisor David E. Daykin.

== Work ==
Much of his work has been done in pioneering techniques in graph theory. He has discovered many results involving Latin squares, including, which states that "if $n-1$ cells of an $n\times n$ matrix are preassigned with no element repeated in any row or column then the remaining $n^2-n+1$ cells can be filled so as to produce a Latin square." Another noteworthy result states that given a k-regular graph with $2n$ vertices, if $k \geq 12n/7$ then it is 1-factorizable.

In 1998, he was awarded the Euler Medal for "a distinguished career in the work he has produced, the people he has trained, and his leadership in the development of combinatorics in Britain." Among the specific things cited for are the creation of two new techniques for solving long standing problems. Through the use of edge colorings in the context of embedding graphs, he was able to settle the Evan's conjecture and the Lindner conjecture. Through the use of graph amalgamations he was able to show many results, including a method for enumerating Hamiltonian decompositions as well as a conjecture about embedding partial triple systems.
