= K. R. Parthasarathy =

K. R. Parthasarathy may refer to:

- K. R. Parthasarathy (probabilist)
- K. R. Parthasarathy (graph theorist)
