= Shaun Wylie =

British mathematician and codebreaker (1913–2009)

- Born: 17 January 1913; Oxford, England
- Died: 2 October 2009 (aged 96)
- Education: Princeton University
- Scientific career
- Fields: Mathematics
- Workplaces: University of Cambridge
- Thesis: Duality and Intersection in General Complexes (1937)
- Doctoral advisor: Solomon Lefschetz
- Doctoral students: Frank Adams; Max Kelly; Crispin Nash-Williams; W. T. Tutte; Christopher Zeeman

Shaun Wylie (17 January 1913 – 2 October 2009) was a British mathematician and World War II codebreaker.

== Early life ==
Wylie was born in Oxford, England. The fourth son of Sir Francis Wylie (later the first Warden of Rhodes House, Oxford) and his wife Kathleen (formerly Kelly), he was educated at the Dragon School (in Oxford) and then Winchester College. He won a scholarship to New College, Oxford where he studied mathematics and classics. In 1934, he went to study topology at Princeton University, obtaining a PhD in 1937 with Solomon Lefschetz as his supervisor. At Princeton he met fellow English mathematician Alan Turing. He became a fellow of Trinity Hall, Cambridge in 1938/1939.

== World War II codebreaking ==
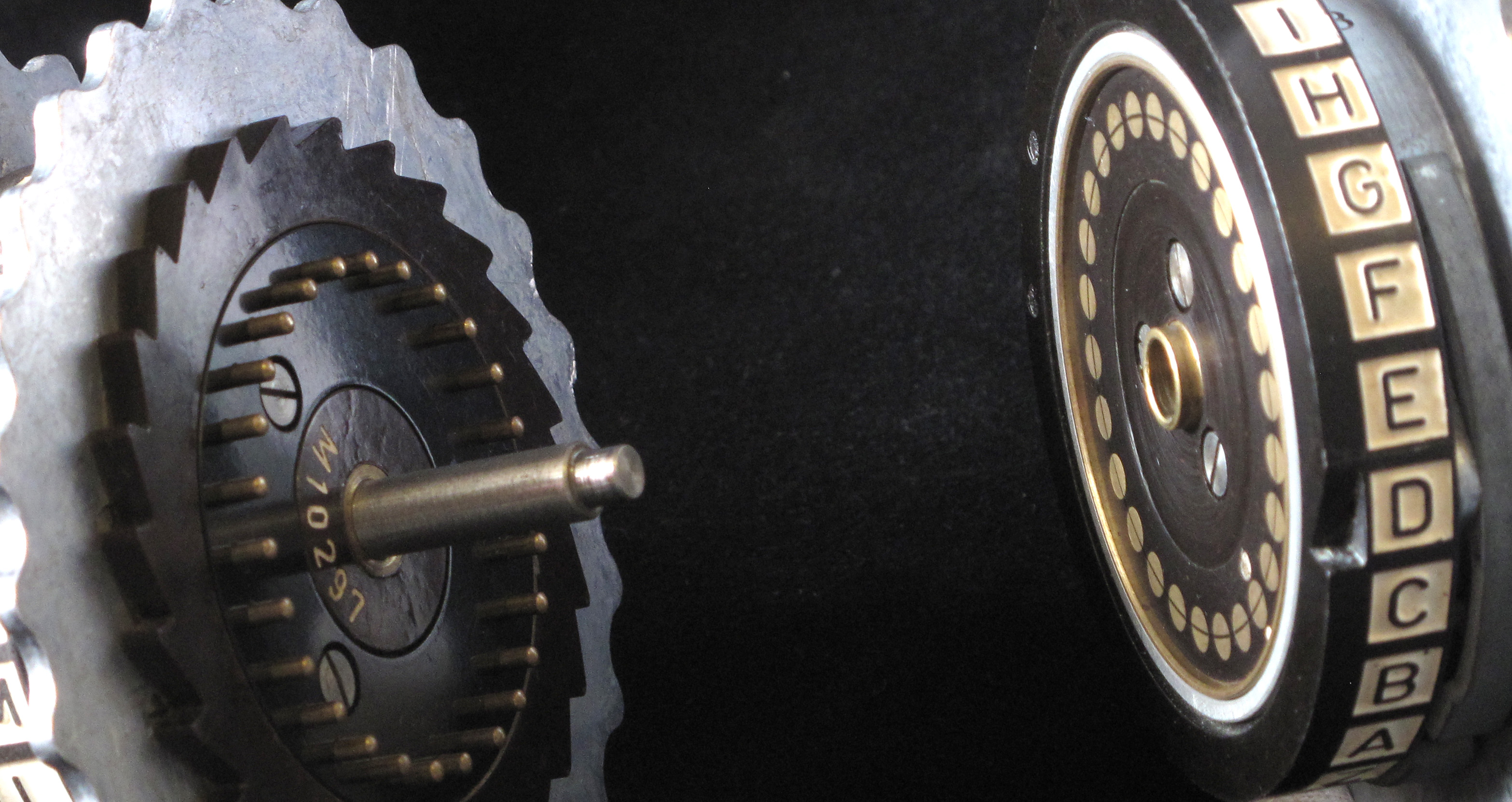
Wylie contributed to the breaking of the Enigma machine code.

During World War II, Turing had been recruited to work at Bletchley Park, Britain's codebreaking centre. Turing wrote to Wylie around December 1940, who was by then teaching at Wellington College, inviting him to work at Bletchley Park. He accepted, and arrived in February 1941. He joined Turing's section, Hut 8, which was working on solving the Enigma machine as used by the Kriegsmarine. He became head of the crib subsection, and allocated time on the bombe codebreaking machines. Hugh Alexander, successor to Turing as head of Hut 8, commented that "except for Turing, no-one made a bigger contribution to the success of Hut 8 than Shaun Wylie; he was astonishingly quick and resourceful and contributed to theory and practice in a number of different directions".

Wylie transferred in Autumn 1943 to work on "Tunny", a German teleprinter cipher. He married Odette Murray, a WREN in the section. In 1945, soon after the victory in Europe, Wylie demonstrated how Colossus – electronic machines used to help solve Tunny – could have been used unmodified to break the Tunny "motor wheels", a task which had been previously done by hand. While at Bletchley Park, he became president of the dramatic club. He had also played international hockey for Scotland, but according to fellow codebreaker I. J. Good, he "never mentioned any of his successes".

== Post-war ==
After the war, he was a fellow at Trinity Hall until 1958 and lectured in mathematics. He was the PhD advisor for Frank Adams, Max Kelly, Crispin Nash-Williams, William Tutte and Christopher Zeeman. With Peter Hilton, he authored Homology Theory: An Introduction to Algebraic Topology, published in 1960.

In 1958, he became Chief Mathematician at GCHQ, the UK signals intelligence organisation. In July 1969, he was sent a draft paper by James H. Ellis, another GCHQ mathematician, about the possibility of what was termed "non-secret encryption", or what is now more commonly known as public-key cryptography, on which Wylie commented "unfortunately, I can't see anything wrong with this". He retired in 1973, and taught at Cambridgeshire High School for Boys (later Hills Road Sixth Form College) in Cambridge for seven years. He was elected an honorary fellow at Trinity Hall in 1980.

Wylie supervised five PhD students at Cambridge, through whom he had over 1600 "descendants" in 2021 according to the American Mathematical Society Mathematical Genealogy Project. In addition he influenced the intellectual development of generations of pupils at the Cambridgeshire High School for Boys/Hills Road Sixth Form College where he taught maths (including statistics, with his beloved chi-squared distribution) and classical Greek and where he also produced plays (such as Chekhov's The Cherry Orchard) and supervised the school chess team. He also came out of retirement temporarily to teach Mathematics at Long Road Sixth Form College.

After retirement from teaching, Wylie was instrumental in the founding of the Liberal Democrats and in the Cambridge-based University of the Third Age and at the time of his death was preparing to read in the next Cambridge Greek Play, Aeschylus' Agamemnon.

His eldest son, the late Keith Wylie (1945–1999), a barrister, was a croquet international and open champion of Great Britain. His second son Malcolm (b1949) pioneered the walk from John o'Groats to Land's End along the British Watershed between 1996 and 2009.

Shaun Wylie died on 2 October 2009, aged 96.
