= CR Rao Advanced Institute of Mathematics, Statistics and Computer Science =

Research institute in Hyderabad, India

CR Rao Advanced Institute of Mathematics, Statistics and Computer Science (also called AIMSCS) was founded in 2007 as an institute for basic research in statistics, computer science and mathematics. It is located on the campus of the University of Hyderabad.

It is named after CR Rao, statistician, as it was built on his suggestion. The government funded institute intends to improve teaching methods and to encourage basic research in mathematical and social sciences. S.B. Rao was the first director.

It has received 10 million rupees in grants from the State Government and individual donors and 2008 it was seeking a further 50 million rupees from the DST.
