= Series-parallel =

The expression series-parallel can apply to different domains:

- Series and parallel circuits for electrical circuits and electronic circuits
- Series-parallel partial order, in partial order theory
- Series–parallel graph in graph theory
- Series–parallel networks problem, a combinatorial problem about series–parallel graphs
