= Graph equation =

In graph theory, Graph equations are equations in which the unknowns are graphs. One of the central questions of graph theory concerns the notion of isomorphism. We ask: When are two graphs the same? (i.e., graph isomorphism) The graphs in question may be expressed differently in terms of graph equations.

What are the graphs (solutions) G and H such that the line graph of G is same as the total graph of H? (What are G and H such that L(G) = T(H) ?).

For example, G = K_{3}, and H = K_{2} are the solutions of the graph equation L(K_{3}) = T(K_{2}) and G = K_{4}, and H = K_{3} are the solutions of the graph equation L(K_{4}) = T(K_{3}).

:::$K_2$

:::$K_3$

:::$K_4$

Note that T(K_{3}) is a 4-regular graph on 6 vertices.

== Selected publications ==
- Graph equations for line graphs and total graphs, DM Cvetkovic, SK Simic – Discrete Mathematics, 1975
- Graph equations, graph inequalities and a fixed point theorem, DM Cvetkovic, IB Lackovic, SK Simic – Publ. Inst. Math.(Belgrade)., 1976 – elib.mi.sanu.ac.yu, PUBLICATIONS DE L'INSTITUT MATHÉMATIQUE Nouvelle série, tome 20 (34), 1976,
- Graphs whose complement and line graph are isomorphic, M Aigner – Journal of Combinatorial Theory, 1969
- Solutions of some further graph equations, Vasanti N. Bhat-Nayak, Ranjan N. Naik – Discrete Mathematics, 47 (1983) 169–175
- More Results on the Graph Equation G2= G, M Capobianco, SR Kim – Graph Theory, Combinatorics, and Algorithms: Proceedings of …, 1995 – Wiley-Interscience
- Graph equation Ln (G)= G, S Simic - Univ. Beograd. Publ. Elektrotehn. Fak. Ser. Mat. Fiz, 1975
