= Fence (mathematics) =

Partially ordered set with alternatingly-related elements

The Hasse diagram of a six-element fence.

In mathematics, a fence, also called a zigzag poset, is a partially ordered set (poset) in which the order relations form a path with alternating orientations:

$$a<b>c<d>e<f>h<i \cdots$$

or

$$a>b<c>d<e>f<h>i \cdots$$

A fence may be finite, or it may be formed by an infinite alternating sequence extending in both directions. The incidence posets of path graphs form examples of fences.

A linear extension of a fence is called an alternating permutation; André's problem of counting the number of different linear extensions has been studied since the 19th century. The solutions to this counting problem, the so-called Euler zigzag numbers or up/down numbers, are:

$$1, 1, 2, 4, 10, 32, 122, 544, 2770, 15872, 101042.$$
(sequence A001250 in the OEIS).

The number of antichains in a fence is a Fibonacci number; the distributive lattice with this many elements, generated from a fence via Birkhoff's representation theorem, has as its graph the Fibonacci cube.

A partially ordered set is series-parallel if and only if it does not have four elements forming a fence.

Several authors have also investigated the number of order-preserving maps from fences to themselves, or to fences of other sizes.

An up-down poset Q(a,b) is a generalization of a zigzag poset in which there are a downward orientations for every upward one and b total elements. For instance, Q(2,9) has the elements and relations

$$a>b>c<d>e>f<g>h>i.$$

In this notation, a fence is a partially ordered set of the form Q(1,n).
