= K. R. Parthasarathy (graph theorist) =

Indian mathematician

K. R. Parthasarathy is a professor emeritus of graph theory from the Department of Mathematics, Indian Institute of Technology Madras, Chennai. He received his Ph.D. (1966) in graph theory from the Indian Institute of Technology Kharagpur. Parthasarathy is known for his work (with his student G. Ravindra) proving the special case of the strong perfect graph conjecture for claw-free graphs. Parthasarathy guided and refereed Ph.D. students in graph theory, among them S. A. Choudum. Parthasarathy wrote a book on graph theory, Basic Graph Theory (Tata McGraw-Hill, 1994).
