= (a, b)-decomposition =

In graph theory, the (a, b)-decomposition of an undirected graph is a partition of its edges into a + 1 sets, each one of them inducing a forest, except one which induces a graph with maximum degree b. If this graph is also a forest, then we call this a F(a, b)-decomposition.

A graph with arboricity a is (a, 0)-decomposable. Every (a, 0)-decomposition or (a, 1)-decomposition is a F(a, 0)-decomposition or a F(a, 1)-decomposition respectively.

== Graph classes ==
- Every planar graph is F(2, 4)-decomposable.
- Every planar graph $G$ with girth at least $g$ is
  - F(2, 0)-decomposable if $g \ge 4$.
  - (1, 4)-decomposable if $g \ge 5$.
  - F(1, 2)-decomposable if $g \ge 6$.
  - F(1, 1)-decomposable if $g \ge 8$, or if every cycle of $G$ is either a triangle or a cycle with at least 8 edges not belonging to a triangle.
  - (1, 5)-decomposable if $G$ has no 4-cycles.
- Every outerplanar graph is F(2, 0)-decomposable and (1, 3)-decomposable.

== References (chronological order) ==
- Nash-Williams, Crispin St. John Alvah (1964). "Decomposition of finite graphs into forests". Journal of the London Mathematical Society. 39 (1): 12. doi:10.1112/jlms/s1-39.1.12. MR 0161333.
- Guan, D. J.; Zhu, Xuding (1999). "Game chromatic number of outerplanar graphs". Journal of Graph Theory. 30 (1): 67–70. doi:10.1002/(sici)1097-0118(199901)30:1<67::aid-jgt7>3.0.co;2-m.
- He, Wenjie; Hou, Xiaoling; Lih, Ko-Wei; Shao, Jiating; Wang, Weifan; Zhu, Xuding (2002). "Edge-partitions of planar graphs and their game coloring numbers". Journal of Graph Theory. 41 (4): 307–311. doi:10.1002/jgt.10069. S2CID 20929383.
- Balogh, József; Kochol, Martin; Pluhár, András; Yu, Xingxing (2005). "Covering planar graphs with forests". Journal of Combinatorial Theory, Series B. 94 (1): 147–158. doi:10.1016/j.ejc.2007.06.020.
- Borodin, Oleg V.; Kostochka, Alexandr V.; Sheikh, Naeem N.; Yu, Gexin (2008). "Decomposing a planar graph with girth 9 into a forest and a matching". European Journal of Combinatorics. 29 (5): 1235–1241. doi:10.1016/j.ejc.2007.06.020.
- Borodin, Oleg V.; Kostochka, Alexandr V.; Sheikh, Naeem N.; Yu, Gexin (2008). "M-Degrees of Quadrangle-Free Planar Graphs" (PDF). Journal of Graph Theory. 60 (1): 80–85. doi:10.1002/jgt.20346. S2CID 7486622.
- Kleitman, Daniel J. (2008). "Partitioning the Edges of a Girth 6 Planar Graph into those of a Forest and those of a Set of Disjoint Paths and Cycles". Manuscript.
- Gonçalves, Daniel (2009). "Covering planar graphs with forests, one having bounded maximum degree". Journal of Combinatorial Theory, Series B. 99 (2): 314–322. doi:10.1016/j.jctb.2008.07.004.
- Borodin, Oleg V.; Ivanova, Anna O.; Kostochka, Alexandr V.; Sheikh, Naeem N. (2009). "Decompositions of Quadrangle-Free Planar Graphs" (PDF). Discussiones Mathematicae Graph Theory. 29: 87–99. doi:10.7151/dmgt.1434.
- Borodin, Oleg V.; Ivanova, Anna O.; Kostochka, Alexandr V.; Sheikh, Naeem N. (2009). "Planar graphs decomposable into a forest and a matching". Discrete Mathematics. 309 (1): 277–279. doi:10.1016/j.disc.2007.12.104.
- Bassa, A.; Burns, J.; Campbell, J.; Deshpande, A.; Farley, J.; Halsey, L.; Ho, S.-Y.; Kleitman, D.; Michalakis, S.; Persson, P.-O.; Pylyavskyy, P.; Rademacher, L.; Riehl, A.; Rios, M.; Samuel, J.; Tenner, B.E.; Vijayasarathy, A.; Zhao, L. (2010). "Partitioning a Planar Graph of Girth 10 into a Forest and a Matching". European Journal of Combinatorics. 124 (3): 213–228. doi:10.1111/j.1467-9590.2009.00468.x. S2CID 120663098.
- Wang, Yingqian; Zhang, Qijun (2011). "Decomposing a planar graph with girth at least 8 into a forest and a matching". Discrete Mathematics. 311 (10–11): 844–849. doi:10.1016/j.disc.2011.01.019.
- Montassier, Mickaël; Ossona de Mendez, Patrice; André, Raspaud; Zhu, Xuding (2012). "Decomposing a graph into forests". Journal of Combinatorial Theory, Series B. 102 (1): 38–52. doi:10.1016/j.jctb.2011.04.001.
