= Disperser =

A disperser is a one-sided extractor. Where an extractor requires that every event gets the same probability under the uniform distribution and the extracted distribution, only the latter is required for a disperser. So for a disperser, an event $A \subseteq \{0,1\}^{m}$ we have: $Pr_{U_{m}}[A] > 1 - \epsilon$

Definition (Disperser): A $(k, \epsilon)$-disperser is a function

$Dis: \{0,1\}^{n}\times \{0,1\}^{d}\rightarrow \{0,1\}^{m}$

such that for every distribution $X$ on $\{0,1\}^{n}$ with $H_{\infty}(X) \geq k$ the support of the distribution $Dis(X,U_{d})$ is of size at least $(1-\epsilon)2^{m}$.

== Graph theory ==
An (N, M, D, K, e)-disperser is a bipartite graph with N vertices on the left side, each with degree D, and M vertices on the right side, such that every subset of K vertices on the left side is connected to more than (1 − e)M vertices on the right.

An extractor is a related type of graph that guarantees an even stronger property; every (N, M, D, K, e)-extractor is also an (N, M, D, K, e)-disperser.

== Other meanings ==
A disperser is a high-speed mixing device used to disperse or dissolve pigments and other solids into a liquid.

== See also ==
- Expander graph
