= Arboricity =

Number of forests a graph's edges may be partitioned into

The arboricity of an undirected graph is the minimum number of forests into which its edges can be partitioned. Equivalently it is the minimum number of spanning forests needed to cover all the edges of the graph. The Nash-Williams theorem provides necessary and sufficient conditions for when a graph is k-arboric.

== Example ==
A partition of the complete bipartite graph K_{4,4} into three forests, showing that it has arboricity at most three.

The figure shows the complete bipartite graph K_{4,4}, with the colors indicating a partition of its edges into three forests. K_{4,4} cannot be partitioned into fewer forests, because any forest on its eight vertices has at most seven edges, while the overall graph has sixteen edges, more than double the number of edges in a single forest. Therefore, the arboricity of K_{4,4} is three.

== Arboricity as a measure of density ==
The arboricity of a graph is a measure of how dense the graph is: graphs with many edges have high arboricity, and graphs with high arboricity must have a dense subgraph.

In more detail, as any n-vertex forest has at most n − 1 edges, the arboricity of a graph with n vertices and m edges is at least $\lceil m/(n-1)\rceil$. Additionally, the subgraphs of any graph cannot have arboricity larger than the graph itself, or equivalently the arboricity of a graph must be at least the maximum arboricity of any of its subgraphs. Nash-Williams proved that these two facts can be combined to characterize arboricity: if we let n_{S} and m_{S} denote the number of vertices and edges, respectively, of any subgraph S of the given graph, then the arboricity of the graph equals $\max_S\{\lceil m_S/(n_S-1)\rceil\}.$

Any planar graph with $n$ vertices has at most $3n-6$ edges, from which it follows by Nash-Williams' formula that planar graphs have arboricity at most three. Schnyder used a special decomposition of a planar graph into three forests called a Schnyder wood to find a straight-line embedding of any planar graph into a grid of small area.

== Algorithms ==
The arboricity of a graph can be expressed as a special case of a more general matroid partitioning problem, in which one wishes to express a set of elements of a matroid as a union of a small number of independent sets. As a consequence, the arboricity can be calculated by a polynomial-time algorithm (Gabow & Westermann 1992). The exact value of the arboricity can be computed in $m^{1+o(1)}$ time, where $m$ is the number of edges in the graph, using a reduction to the directed minimum-cut problem. For simple graphs, an optimal partition into forests can be constructed in $\min\{n^{2+o(1)},m^{4/3+o(1)}\}$ time, where $n$ is the number of vertices.

Approximations to the arboricity of a graph can also be computed efficiently. There are linear-time 2-approximation algorithms. A partition of the edges into at most one more forest than optimal can also be found in $m^{1+o(1)}$ time.

== Related concepts ==
The anarboricity of a graph is the maximum number of edge-disjoint nonacyclic subgraphs into which the edges of the graph can be partitioned.

The star arboricity of a graph is the size of the minimum forest, each tree of which is a star (tree with at most one non-leaf node), into which the edges of the graph can be partitioned. If a tree is not a star itself, its star arboricity is two, as can be seen by partitioning the edges into two subsets at odd and even distances from the tree root respectively. Therefore, the star arboricity of any graph is at least equal to the arboricity, and at most equal to twice the arboricity.

The linear arboricity of a graph is the minimum number of linear forests (a collection of paths) into which the edges of the graph can be partitioned. The linear arboricity of a graph is closely related to its maximum degree and its slope number.

The pseudoarboricity of a graph is the minimum number of pseudoforests into which its edges can be partitioned. Equivalently, it is the maximum ratio of edges to vertices in any subgraph of the graph, rounded up to an integer. As with the arboricity, the pseudoarboricity has a matroid structure allowing it to be computed efficiently (Gabow & Westermann 1992).

The subgraph density of a graph is the density of its densest subgraph.

The thickness of a graph is the minimum number of planar subgraphs into which its edges can be partitioned. As any planar graph has arboricity three, the thickness of any graph is at least equal to a third of the arboricity, and at most equal to the arboricity.

The degeneracy of a graph is the maximum, over all induced subgraphs of the graph, of the minimum degree of a vertex in the subgraph. The degeneracy of a graph with arboricity $a$ is at least equal to $a$, and at most equal to $2a-1$. The coloring number of a graph, also known as its Szekeres-Wilf number (Szekeres & Wilf 1968) is always equal to its degeneracy plus 1 (Jensen & Toft 1995, p. 77f.).

The strength of a graph is a fractional value whose integer part gives the maximum number of disjoint spanning trees that can be drawn in a graph. It is the packing problem that is dual to the covering problem raised by the arboricity. The two parameters have been studied together by Tutte and Nash-Williams.

The fractional arboricity is a refinement of the arboricity, as it is defined for a graph $G$ as $\max\{m_S/(n_S-1) \mid S \subseteq G\}.$ In other terms, the arboricity of a graph is the ceiling of the fractional arboricity.

The (a,b)-decomposability generalizes the arboricity. A graph is $(a,b)$-decomposable if its edges can be partitioned into $a+1$ sets, each one of them inducing a forest, except one who induces a graph with maximum degree $b$. A graph with arboricity $a$ is $(a,0)$-decomposable.

The tree number is the minimal number of trees covering the edges of a graph.

== Special appearances ==
Arboricity appears in the Goldberg–Seymour conjecture.
