= Adjacency algebra =

In algebraic graph theory, the adjacency algebra of a graph G is the algebra of polynomials in the adjacency matrix A(G) of the graph. It is an example of a matrix algebra and is the set of the linear combinations of powers of A.

Some other similar mathematical objects are also called "adjacency algebra".

== Properties ==
Properties of the adjacency algebra of G are associated with various spectral, adjacency and connectivity properties of G.

Statement. The number of walks of length d between vertices i and j is equal to the (i, j)-th element of A^{d}.

Statement. The dimension of the adjacency algebra of a connected graph of diameter d is at least d + 1.

Corollary. A connected graph of diameter d has at least d + 1 distinct eigenvalues.

== Spectral Properties ==
Adjacency algebra is closely linked with Spectral graph theory due to both them having the involvement of the Adjacency matrix of a graph and its eigenvalues. Spectral graph theory is about how eigenvalues, eigenvectors, and other linear-algebraic quantities give us useful information about a graph, for example about how well-connected it is, how well we can cluster or color the nodes, and how quickly random walks converge to a limiting distribution. In the context of Spectral graph theory the eigenvectors and the eigenvalues of graph's Adjacency matrix provide valid and essential insights into several structural properties such as connectivity, clustering, coloring, and the behavior of random walks, these insights are tightly tied to the adjacency algebra generated by the Adjacency matrix, including all its powers and linear combinations.

Both concepts are concerned with the adjacency matrix but approach it differently and are looked with different perspectives, Spectral graph theory focuses more on the specific spectral properties (eigenvalues and eigenvectors) to extract information about the graph's connectivity. In contrast adjacency algebra works more with matrix powers and linear combinations to understand the graphs structure more algebraically.

== Applications of Adjacency Algebra ==
Adjacency algebra has several applications both in mathematics and computer science. Adjacency algebra can be utilized in network analysis and graph theory, where the powers of the adjacency matrix can help to determine how connected a specific graph is by tracking paths of length k between vertices. It can also be used with graph partitioning and graph theory based AI and Large language models.
