= British watershed =

Watershed of Great Britain

The British watershed is the 1,800-mile (2,900 km) drainage divide in Great Britain that separates river systems that flow to the east and south into the North Sea and the English Channel from those that flow to the west and north into the Atlantic Ocean and the Irish Sea. In British English the word "watershed" refers to a drainage divide, the line between drainage basins, while in American English it refers to the drainage basin.

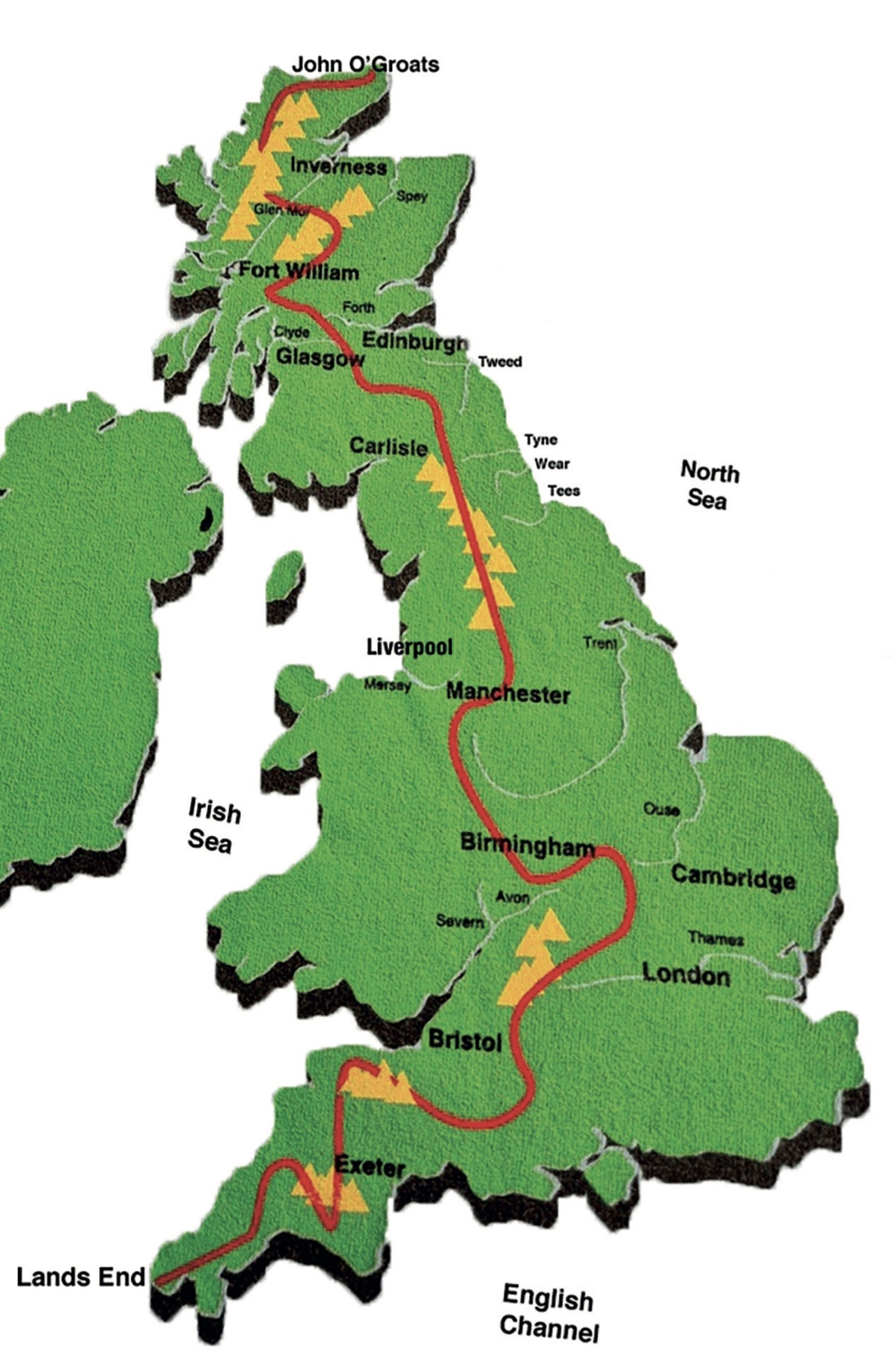
Map of the British Watershed

This watershed is self-defining, and is not marked on the ground in any way. Alfred Wainwright explained the concept in his Pennine Way Companion (a guide to the Pennine Way, a walking route along the Pennine Hills in northern England) as follows:

The main watershed of northern England is the line that divides the west-flowing streams (Irish Sea) and the east-flowing streams (North Sea). This watershed is, naturally, the crest of the Pennine Range. It is not an arbitrary or imaginary line; obviously it exists although not marked on maps and not often clearly defined on the ground. It must exist, just as the law of gravity exists – rain falling on the Pennines must run off by pre-destined courses, downhill, and whether ultimately to east or west depends on where it falls. ... A walk ... keeping strictly to the main watershed, would be extremely arduous ... The route of the Pennine Way is kinder. Only rarely does it coincide with the main watershed... before deflecting to the easier flanks.

== Line of the watershed ==
Although the Scottish watershed has been walked and described by several people, the English section of the British watershed has apparently received less attention. Its northern section, the Pennine watershed, is described and illustrated by Andrew Bibby in his book The Backbone of England. The UK Environment Agency has a website which identifies the catchment areas of the river systems, and can thus be used to trace the watersheds between them. The Foundation for Water Research displayed a map showing the "river basin districts" into which it divided the country, thus illustrating the watershed except in the south west of England which was considered as one district.

Here is a summary of the line of the watershed from north to south.

=== Scotland ===
Section of watershed	Endpoints and distance in miles	Main summits	Major rivers to the north and west	Major rivers to the south and east
The Flow Country	John o'Groats to Loch Merkland; 145 miles (233 km)	Ben Hee	Thurso, Naver	Helmsdale
The Northwest Highlands	Loch Merkland to the Great Glenn (Loch Oich) 190 miles (306 km)	40 Munros (from Conival to Sgurr nan Goirechan)	Broom, Carron, Lochy	Oykel, Bran, Beauly, Moriston, Garry
The Grampian Mountains	The Great Glen to Drymen 180 miles (290 km)	10 Munros (from Stob Poite Coire Ardair to Ben Lomond)	Spean, Orchy	Spey, Tummel, Lyon, Earn, Forth
The Central Lowlands	Drymen to Shotts 75 miles (121 km)	Campsie Fells	Clyde	Forth, Tweed
The Southern Uplands	Shotts to the Border 155 miles (249km)	Hart Fell, Ettrick Pen, Peel Fell	Clyde, Annan	Tweed, Tyne

=== England ===
Section of watershed	Endpoints and distance	Main summits	Major rivers to the north and west	Major rivers to the south and east
The Pennines	The Border to Settle 150 miles (241 km)	Cross Fell, High Seat, Pen-y-Ghent	Eden, Lune, Ribble, Mersey	Tyne, Tees, Ure, Trent
The Peak District	Settle to Buxton 130 miles (209 km)	Bleaklow, Kinder Plateau	Goyt, Tame	Derwent, Dove
The Midlands	Buxton to Daventry 210 miles (338 km)	The Roaches	Severn, Avon, Stour	Trent, Nene, Welland
The Northamptonshire Uplands and Cotswolds	Daventry to Swindon 130 miles (209 km)	Cleeve Hill	Severn, Avon, Churn	Swere, Windrush, Colne, Thames
Wessex	Swindon to Exmoor 190 miles (306 km)	Salisbury Plain, Dunkery Beacon	Parrett, Tone	Wylye, Culm
The Southwest	Exmoor to Land's End 240 miles (386 km)	Dartmoor, Bodmin Moor	Taw, Torridge, Camel, Hayle	Exe, Tamar, Fowey, Fal

== Walking the watershed ==
There are a number of possible termini for the complete British watershed, but most people who attempt the end-to-end journey (by whatever means) travel from Land's End to John o' Groats or vice versa.

The only way to complete a journey along the watershed is on foot. Two people are known to have completed it:

- Mike Allen walked a route from Land's End to Cape Wrath, in numerous mainly short sections, April 1988 – October 1994. The working title for this achievement was "Mike's Silly Walk", but it was never written up before his death.
- Malcolm Wylie completed a 130-day traverse of the UK on a slightly different route, from John o'Groats to Land's End in 14 sections between 1996 and 2009, covering 1800 miles. This is described in his book Walking the British Watershed.
