= Graph amalgamation =

In graph theory, a graph amalgamation is a relationship between two graphs (one graph is an amalgamation of another). Similar relationships include subgraphs and minors. Amalgamations can provide a way to reduce a graph to a simpler graph while keeping certain structure intact. The amalgamation can then be used to study properties of the original graph in an easier to understand context. Applications include embeddings, computing genus distribution, and Hamiltonian decompositions.

== Definition ==
Let $G$ and $H$ be two graphs with the same number of edges where $G$ has more vertices than $H$. Then we say that $H$ is an amalgamation of $G$ if there is a bijection $\phi: E(G) \to E(H)$ and a surjection $\psi: V(G) \to V(H)$ and the following hold:

- If $x$, $y$ are two vertices in $G$ where $\psi(x) \neq \psi(y)$, and both $x$ and $y$ are adjacent by edge $e$ in $G$, then $\psi(x)$ and $\psi(y)$ are adjacent by edge $\phi(e)$ in $H$.
- If $e$ is a loop on a vertex $x \in V(G)$, then $\phi(e)$ is a loop on $\psi(x) \in H$.
- If $e$ joins $x,y \in V(G)$, where $x \neq y$, but $\psi(x) = \psi(y)$, then $\phi(e)$ is a loop on $\psi(x)$.

Note that while $G$ can be a graph or a pseudograph, it will usually be the case that $H$ is a pseudograph.

=== Properties ===
Edge colorings are invariant to amalgamation. This is obvious, as all of the edges between the two graphs are in bijection with each other. However, what may not be obvious, is that if $G$ is a complete graph of the form $K_{2n+1}$, and we color the edges as to specify a Hamiltonian decomposition (a decomposition into Hamiltonian paths), then those edges also form a Hamiltonian Decomposition in $H$.

== Example ==
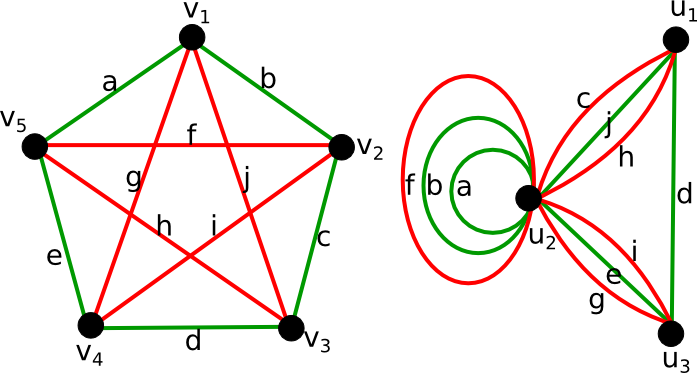
Figure 1: An amalgamation of the complete graph on five vertices.

Figure 1 illustrates an amalgamation of $K_5$. The invariance of edge coloring and Hamiltonian Decomposition can be seen clearly. The function $\phi$ is a bijection and is given as letters in the figure. The function $\psi$ is given in the table below.

$v \in V(G)$	$\psi(v)$
$v_1$	$u_2$
$v_2$	$u_2$
$v_3$	$u_1$
$v_4$	$u_3$
$v_5$	$u_2$

=== Hamiltonian decompositions ===
One of the ways in which amalgamations can be used is to find Hamiltonian Decompositions of complete graphs with 2n + 1 vertices. The idea is to take a graph and produce an amalgamation of it which is edge colored in $n$ colors and satisfies certain properties (called an outline Hamiltonian decomposition). We can then 'reverse' the amalgamation and we are left with $K_{2n+1}$ colored in a Hamiltonian Decomposition.

In Hilton outlines a method for doing this, as well as a method for finding all Hamiltonian Decompositions without repetition. The methods rely on a theorem he provides which states (roughly) that if we have an outline Hamiltonian decomposition, we could have arrived at it by first starting with a Hamiltonian decomposition of the complete graph and then finding an amalgamation for it.
