= Graphs and Combinatorics =

Graphs and Combinatorics (ISSN 0911-0119, abbreviated Graphs Combin.) is a peer-reviewed academic journal in graph theory, combinatorics, and discrete geometry published by Springer Japan. Its editor-in-chief is Katsuhiro Ota of Keio University.

The journal was first published in 1985. Its founding editor in chief was Hoon Heng Teh of Singapore, the president of the Southeast Asian Mathematics Society, and its managing editor was Jin Akiyama. Originally, it was subtitled "An Asian Journal".

In most years since 1999, it has been ranked as a second-quartile journal in discrete mathematics and theoretical computer science by SCImago Journal Rank.
