= Nash-Williams theorem =

Theorem on edge-disjoint spanning trees

In graph theory, the Nash-Williams theorem is a tree-packing theorem that describes how many edge-disjoint spanning trees (and more generally forests) a graph can have:

A graph G has t edge-disjoint spanning trees iff for every partition $V_1, \ldots, V_k \subset V(G)$ where $V_i \neq \emptyset$ there are at least t(k − 1) crossing edges.

The theorem was proved independently by Tutte and Nash-Williams, both in 1961. In 2012, Kaiser gave a short elementary proof.

For this article, we say that such a graph has arboricity t or is t-arboric. (The actual definition of arboricity is slightly different and applies to forests rather than trees.)

== Related tree-packing properties ==
A k-arboric graph is necessarily k-edge connected. The converse is not true.

As a corollary of the Nash-Williams theorem, every 2k-edge connected graph is k-arboric.

Both Nash-Williams' theorem and Menger's theorem characterize when a graph has k edge-disjoint paths between two vertices.

== Nash-Williams theorem for forests ==
In 1964, Nash-Williams generalized the above result to forests:

A graph $G$ can be partitioned into $t$ edge-disjoint forests iff for every $U \subset V(G)$, the induced subgraph $G[U]$ has at most $t(|U|-1)$ edges.

Other proofs are given here.

This is how people usually define what it means for a graph to be t-arboric.

In other words, for every subgraph $S=G[U]$, we have $t \geq \lceil E(S) / (V(S) - 1) \rceil$. It is tight in that there is a subgraph $S$ that saturates the inequality (or else we can choose a smaller $t$). This leads to the following formula

$t = \lceil \max_{S \subset G} \frac{E(S)}{V(S) - 1} \rceil$,

also referred to as the Nash-Williams formula.

The general problem is to ask when a graph can be covered by edge-disjoint subgraphs.

== See also ==
- Arboricity
- Bridge (cut edge)
- Matroid partitioning
- Menger's theorem
- Tree packing conjecture
