= Crispin Nash-Williams =

British mathematician

Crispin Nash-Williams FRSE
- Born: Crispin St John Alvah Nash-Williams; 19 December 1932; Cardiff, Wales
- Died: 20 January 2001 (aged 68); Ascot, Berkshire, England
- Education: University of Cambridge
- Known for: Nash-Williams theorem
- Scientific career
- Fields: Mathematics
- Workplaces: University of Aberdeen, University of Waterloo, University of Reading
- Thesis: Decomposition of Graphs into Infinite Chains (1959)
- Doctoral advisor: Shaun Wylie; David Rees
- Doctoral students: Václav Chvátal; Alexander Dewdney; Dragan Marušič

Crispin St John Alvah Nash-Williams FRSE (19 December 1932 – 20 January 2001) was a British mathematician. His research interest was in the field of discrete mathematics, especially graph theory.

== Biography ==
Nash-Williams was born on 19 December 1932 in Cardiff, Wales. His father, Victor Erle Nash-Williams (né Williams), was an archaeologist at University College Cardiff, and his mother had studied classics at Oxford. As a small boy, Nash-Williams attended Christ Church Cathedral School in Oxford, which was then headed by Wilfrid Oldaker. A biographer has said that Oldaker was a formative influence on Nash-Williams. He then attended Rugby School until the age of 18.

After studying mathematics as an undergraduate at Trinity Hall, Cambridge, earning the title of Senior Wrangler in 1953, he remained there for his graduate studies, under the supervision of Shaun Wylie and David Rees. He then continued his education for a year at Princeton University, with Norman Steenrod; all three of Wylie, Rees, and Steenrod are listed as the supervisors of his Ph.D. dissertation. He finished his dissertation in 1958, but before doing so he returned to Britain as an assistant lecturer at the University of Aberdeen.

He remained in Aberdeen for ten years, during which time he was twice promoted. In 1967 he moved to the University of Waterloo and became one of the three faculty members in the newly formed Department of Combinatorics and Optimization there. In 1972, he returned to Aberdeen as Professor of Pure Mathematics, but stayed only briefly, moving to the University of Reading in 1975. There he succeeded Richard Rado, who had earlier been one of his dissertation examiners.

He retired in 1996 and died on 20 January 2001, aged 68, in Ascot, Berkshire, where his brother was rector.

== Awards and honours ==
He was elected to the Royal Society of Edinburgh in 1969. In 1994, the University of Waterloo gave him an honorary doctorate for his contributions to combinatorics. A conference in his honor was held on his retirement in 1996, the proceedings of which were published as a festschrift. The 18th British Combinatorial Conference, held in Sussex in July 2001, was dedicated to his memory.

== Contributions ==
He is known for the Nash-Williams theorem.

Hilton writes that "Themes running through his papers are Hamiltonian cycles, Eulerian graphs, spanning trees, the marriage problem, detachments, reconstruction, and infinite graphs." In his first papers Nash-Williams considered the knight's tour and random walk problems on infinite graphs; the latter paper included an important recurrence criterion for general Markov chains, and was also the first to apply electrical network techniques of Rayleigh to random walks. His dissertation, which he finished in 1958, concerned generalizations of Euler tours to infinite graphs.

Welsh writes that his subsequent work defining and characterizing the arboricity of graphs (discovered in parallel and independently by W. T. Tutte) has "had a huge impact," in part because of its implications in matroid theory. Nash-Williams also studied k-edge-connected graphs, Hamiltonian cycles in dense graphs, versions of the reconstruction conjecture for infinite graphs, and the theory of quasi-orders. He also gave a short elegant proof of Kruskal's tree theorem.

== See also ==
- List of University of Waterloo people
