= Acyclic coloring =

Graph coloring in which all 2-chromatic subgraphs are acyclic

The acyclic chromatic number of the McGee graph is 3.

In graph theory, an acyclic coloring is a (proper) vertex coloring in which every 2-chromatic subgraph is acyclic. The acyclic chromatic number A(G) of a graph G is the fewest colors needed in any acyclic coloring of G.

Acyclic coloring is often associated with graphs embedded on non-plane surfaces.

== Upper bounds ==
A(G) ≤ 2 if and only if G is acyclic.

Bounds on A(G) in terms of Δ(G), the maximum degree of G, include the following:

- A(G) ≤ 4 if Δ(G) = 3. (Grünbaum 1973)
- A(G) ≤ 5 if Δ(G) = 4. (Burstein 1979)
- A(G) ≤ 7 if Δ(G) = 5. (Kostochka & Stocker 2011)
- A(G) ≤ 12 if Δ(G) = 6. (Varagani et al. 2009)

A milestone in the study of acyclic coloring is the following affirmative answer to a conjecture of Grünbaum:

Theorem (Borodin 1979) A(G) ≤ 5 if G is planar graph.

Grünbaum (1973) introduced acyclic coloring and acyclic chromatic number, and conjectured the result in the above theorem. Borodin's proof involved several years of painstaking inspection of 450 reducible configurations. One consequence of this theorem is that every planar graph can be decomposed into an independent set and two induced forests. (Stein 1970, 1971)

== Algorithms and complexity ==
It is NP-complete to determine whether A(G) ≤ 3. (Kostochka 1978)

Coleman & Cai (1986) showed that the decision variant of the problem is NP-complete even when G is a bipartite graph.

Gebremedhin et al. (2008) demonstrated that every proper vertex coloring of a chordal graph is also an acyclic coloring. Since chordal graphs can be optimally colored in O(n + m) time, the same is also true for acyclic coloring on that class of graphs.

A linear-time algorithm to acyclically color a graph of maximum degree ≤ 3 using 4 colors or fewer was given by Skulrattanakulchai (2004).

== See also ==
- Star coloring
