= Frequency partition of a graph =

In graph theory, a discipline within mathematics, the frequency partition of a graph (simple graph) is a partition of its vertices grouped by their degree. For example, the degree sequence of the left-hand graph below is (3, 3, 3, 2, 2, 1) and its frequency partition is 6 = 3 + 2 + 1. This indicates that it has 3 vertices with some degree, 2 vertices with some other degree, and 1 vertex with a third degree. The degree sequence of the bipartite graph in the middle below is (3, 2, 2, 2, 2, 2, 1, 1, 1) and its frequency partition is 9 = 5 + 3 + 1. The degree sequence of the right-hand graph below is (3, 3, 3, 3, 3, 3, 2) and its frequency partition is 7 = 6 + 1.

A graph with frequency partition 6 = 3 + 2 + 1.

A bipartite graph with frequency partition 9 = 5 + 3 + 1.

A graph with frequency partition 7 = 6 + 1.

In general, there are many non-isomorphic graphs with a given frequency partition. A graph and its complement have the same frequency partition. For any partition p = f_{1} + f_{2} + ... + f_{k} of an integer p > 1, other than p = 1 + 1 + 1 + ... + 1, there is at least one (connected) simple graph having this partition as its frequency partition.

Frequency partitions of various graph families are completely identified; frequency partitions of many families of graphs are not identified.

== Frequency partitions of Eulerian graphs ==
For a frequency partition p = f_{1} + f_{2} + ... + f_{k} of an integer p > 1, its graphic degree sequence is denoted as ((d_{1})^{f_{1}},(d_{2})^{f_{2}}, (d_{3})^{f_{3}}, ..., (d_{k}) ^{f_{k}}) where degrees d_{i}'s are different and f_{i} ≥ f_{j} for i < j. Bhat-Nayak et al. (1979) showed that a partition of p with k parts, k ≤ integral part of $(p-1)/2$ is a frequency partition of a Eulerian graph and conversely.

== Frequency partition of trees, Hamiltonian graphs, tournaments and hypegraphs ==
The frequency partitions of families of graphs such as trees, Hamiltonian graphs directed graphs and tournaments and to k-uniform hypergraphs. have been characterized.

== Unsolved problems in frequency partitions ==
The frequency partitions of the following families of graphs have not yet been characterized:

- Line graphs
- Bipartite graphs

== External section ==
- Berge, C. (1989), Hypergraphs, Combinatorics of Finite sets, Amsterdam: North-Holland, ISBN 0-444-87489-5
