= Rostock – Landkreis Rostock II =

Federal electoral district of Germany

14 Rostock – Landkreis Rostock II
- Electoral district for the Bundestag
- Rostock – Landkreis Rostock II in 2025
- State: Mecklenburg-Vorpommern
- Population: 276,500 (2019)
- Electorate: 222,705 (2021)
- Major settlements: Rostock
- Area: 994.5 km^{2}

Current electoral district
- Created: 1990
- Party: AfD
- Member: Steffi Burmeister vacant
- Elected: 2025

Rostock – Landkreis Rostock II is an electoral constituency (German: Wahlkreis) represented in the Bundestag. It elects one member via first-past-the-post voting. Under the current constituency numbering system, it is designated as constituency 14. It is located in northern Mecklenburg-Vorpommern, comprising the independent city of Rostock and the northern part of the Landkreis Rostock district.

Rostock – Landkreis Rostock II was created for the inaugural 1990 federal election after German reunification. From 2021 to 2025, it was represented by Katrin Zschau of the Social Democratic Party (SPD). In 2025 it was won by Steffi Burmeister, but the constituency remained vacant.

== Geography ==
Rostock – Landkreis Rostock II is located in northern Mecklenburg-Vorpommern. As of the 2021 federal election, it comprises the independent city of Rostock and northern parts of the Landkreis Rostock district, specifically the municipalities of Dummerstorf, Graal-Müritz, and Sanitz and the Ämter of Carbäk, Rostocker Heide, Schwaan, Tessin, and Warnow-West.

== History ==
Rostock – Landkreis Rostock II was created after German reunification in 1990, then known as Rostock. Until 2002, it was constituency 265 in the numbering system. Originally, it comprised only the independent city of Rostock. In the 2005 election, it acquired the municipalities of Graal-Müritz and Sanitz and the Ämter of Carbäk, Rostocker Heide, and Tessin from the now-abolished Bad Doberan district. In the 2013 election, was further expanded to its current borders and renamed to Rostock – Landkreis Rostock II.

Election	No.	Name	Borders
1990	265	Rostock	Rostock city
1994	265	Rostock	Rostock city
1998	265	Rostock	Rostock city
2002	14	Rostock	Rostock city
2005	14	Rostock	Rostock city; Bad Doberan district (only Graal-Müritz and Sanitz municipalities and Carbäk Amt, Rostocker Heide Amt, Schwaan Amt, and Tessin Amt)
2009	14	Rostock	Rostock city; Bad Doberan district (only Graal-Müritz and Sanitz municipalities and Carbäk Amt, Rostocker Heide Amt, Schwaan Amt, and Tessin Amt)
2013	14	Rostock – Landkreis Rostock II	Rostock city; Bad Doberan district (only Dummerstorf, Graal-Müritz, and Sanitz municipalities and Carbäk Amt, Rostocker Heide Amt, Schwaan Amt, Tessin Amt, and Warnow-West Amt)
2017	14	Rostock – Landkreis Rostock II	Rostock city; Bad Doberan district (only Dummerstorf, Graal-Müritz, and Sanitz municipalities and Carbäk Amt, Rostocker Heide Amt, Schwaan Amt, Tessin Amt, and Warnow-West Amt)
2021	14	Rostock – Landkreis Rostock II	Rostock city; Bad Doberan district (only Dummerstorf, Graal-Müritz, and Sanitz municipalities and Carbäk Amt, Rostocker Heide Amt, Schwaan Amt, Tessin Amt, and Warnow-West Amt)
2025	14	Rostock – Landkreis Rostock II	Rostock city; Bad Doberan district (only Dummerstorf, Graal-Müritz, and Sanitz municipalities and Carbäk Amt, Rostocker Heide Amt, Schwaan Amt, Tessin Amt, and Warnow-West Amt)

== Members ==
The constituency was held by the Social Democratic Party (SPD) from its creation in 1990 until 2009, during which time it was represented by Christine Lucyga (until 2005) and Christian Kleiminger. In 2009, it was won by Steffen Bockhahn of The Left. Peter Stein of the Christian Democratic Union (CDU) won the constituency in 2013, and was re-elected in 2017. Katrin Zschau regained it for the SPD in 2021.

Election	Member	Party	%
1990	Christine Lucyga	SPD	34.4
1994	Christine Lucyga	SPD	33.2
1998	Christine Lucyga	SPD	36.8
2002	Christine Lucyga	SPD	45.2
2005	Christian Kleiminger	SPD	37.7
2009	Steffen Bockhahn	LINKE	32.3
2013	Peter Stein	CDU	35.0
2017	Peter Stein	CDU	29.5
2021	Katrin Zschau	SPD	27.0
2025	Vacant (Note: Steffi Burmeister (AfD) won with 26.8% but seat remained vacant due to insufficient second votes cover.)		

== Election results ==
=== 2025 election ===
Federal election (2025): Rostock – Landkreis Rostock II
Notes:	Blue background denotes the winner of the electorate vote. Pink background denotes a candidate elected from their party list. Yellow background denotes an electorate win by a list member, or other incumbent. A ✓ or ✗ denotes status of any incumbent, win or lose respectively.						
Party	Candidate	Votes	%	±%	Party votes	%	±%
AfD	Steffi Burmeister	47,598	26.8	▲14.6	45,612	25.6	▲12.9
Left	Dietmar Bartsch	45,521	25.6	▲7.4	30,739	17.3	▲4.1
CDU	Michael Ebert	34,403	19.4	▲2.4	29,907	16.8	▲2.6
SPD	✗ Katrin Zschau	30,031	16.9	▼10.0	25,383	14.3	▼14.8
BSW					17,598	9.9	New
Greens	Felix Winter	9,397	5.3	▼4.9	15,933	9.0	▼3.9
FDP	Kai-Uwe Richter	5,037	2.8	▼4.7	6,057	3.4	▼5.7
Tierschutzpartei					2,783	1.6	▼0.9
Volt					1,702	1.0	▲0.6
FW	Roger Schmidt	3,431	1.9	▲0.6	1,505	0.8	▼0.3
BD	Jeremy Brehme	1,527	0.9	New	548	0.3	New
MLPD	Giselher Schilke	620	0.3	▲0.1	238	0.1	0.0
Informal votes		1,534			1,094		
Total valid votes		177,565			178,005		
Turnout		179,099	81.0	▲6.7			
AfD gain from SPD	Majority	2,077	1.2	N/A			

=== 2021 election ===
Federal election (2021): Rostock – Landkreis Rostock II
Notes:	Blue background denotes the winner of the electorate vote. Pink background denotes a candidate elected from their party list. Yellow background denotes an electorate win by a list member, or other incumbent. A ✓ or ✗ denotes status of any incumbent, win or lose respectively.						
Party	Candidate	Votes	%	±%	Party votes	%	±%
SPD	Katrin Zschau	43,932	27.0	▲9.0	47,280	29.0	▲13.2
Left	Dietmar Bartsch	29,715	18.2	▼6.6	21,491	13.2	▼7.5
CDU	✗ Peter Stein	27,672	17.0	▼12.6	23,103	14.2	▼16.3
AfD	Tobias Pontow	19,882	12.2	▼2.5	20,658	12.7	▼2.8
Greens	Andreas Tesche	16,556	10.2	▲5.0	20,941	12.8	▲6.5
FDP	Hagen Reinhold	12,242	7.5	▲3.0	14,852	9.1	▲2.5
dieBasis	Susanne Kreft	4,744	2.9		3,488	2.1	
Tierschutzpartei	Seraphine Jörn	4,476	2.7		3,935	2.4	▲1.2
PARTEI					2,036	1.2	▼0.3
FW	Christine Dubberke	2,131	1.3	▲0.4	1,871	1.1	▲0.6
Pirates	Jan-Peter Rühmann	1,304	0.8		854	0.5	
NPD					696	0.4	▼0.1
Volt					501	0.3	
Team Todenhöfer					408	0.3	
Humanists					290	0.2	
ÖDP					274	0.2	0.0
MLPD	Eric Dunst	356	0.2	0.0	152	0.1	▼0.1
DKP					147	0.1	
Informal votes		2,319			2,352		
Total valid votes		163,010			162,977		
Turnout		165,329	74.2	▲0.7			
SPD gain from CDU	Majority	14,217	8.8				

=== 2017 election ===
Federal election (2017): Rostock – Landkreis Rostock II
Notes:	Blue background denotes the winner of the electorate vote. Pink background denotes a candidate elected from their party list. Yellow background denotes an electorate win by a list member, or other incumbent. A ✓ or ✗ denotes status of any incumbent, win or lose respectively.						
Party	Candidate	Votes	%	±%	Party votes	%	±%
CDU	✓ Peter Stein	47,923	29.5	▼5.5	49,433	30.5	▼7.5
Left	Dietmar Bartsch	40,202	24.8	▼6.0	33,575	20.7	▼3.1
SPD	Christian Reinke	29,056	17.9	▼0.4	25,650	15.8	▼3.4
AfD	Stephan Schmidt	23,785	14.7		25,171	15.5	▲10.1
Greens	Uwe Flachsmeyer	8,333	5.1	▼2.3	10,229	6.3	▼0.2
FDP	Hagen Reinhold	7,368	4.5	▲3.5	10,661	6.6	▲4.6
PARTEI	Eric Adelsberger	3,132	1.9		2,517	1.6	
Tierschutzpartei					2,008	1.2	
FW	Arne Gericke	1,453	0.9	0.0	955	0.6	▼0.1
NPD					907	0.6	▼1.1
ÖDP	Torsten Frosina	591	0.4		349	0.2	
BGE					564	0.3	
MLPD	Philipp Schwartz	396	0.2	▼0.1	303	0.2	0.0
Informal votes		1,777			1,694		
Total valid votes		162,239			162,322		
Turnout		164,016	73.6	▲5.3			
CDU hold	Majority	7,721	4.7	▲0.3			

=== 2013 election ===
Federal election (2013): Rostock – Landkreis Rostock II
Notes:	Blue background denotes the winner of the electorate vote. Pink background denotes a candidate elected from their party list. Yellow background denotes an electorate win by a list member, or other incumbent. A ✓ or ✗ denotes status of any incumbent, win or lose respectively.						
Party	Candidate	Votes	%	±%	Party votes	%	±%
CDU	Peter Stein	52,661	35.1	▲7.1	57,188	37.9	▲10.0
Left	✗ Steffen Bockhahn	46,160	30.7	▼0.8	35,792	23.7	▼6.8
SPD	Christian Kleiminger	27,498	18.3	▼1.5	29,010	18.2	▲1.4
Greens	Harald Terpe	11,216	7.5	▼2.8	11,216	6.5	▼1.6
AfD					8,196	5.4	
Pirates	Michael Slobidnyk	3,263	2.2		3,588	2.4	▼0.7
NPD	Normen Schreiter	3,308	2.2	▼0.3	2,484	1.6	▼0.7
Independent	Steffen Wiechmann	2,509	1.7				
FDP	Hagen Reinhold	1,606	1.1	▼5.7	2,911	1.9	▼7.8
FW	Klaus-Dieter Gabbert	1,385	0.9		1,109	0.7	
MLPD	Renate Voß	545	0.4		292	0.2	0.0
PRO					224	0.1	
REP					106	0.1	▼0.1
Informal votes		2,669			2,046		
Total valid votes		150,151			150,774		
Turnout		152,820	68.3	▲1.9			
CDU gain from Left	Majority	6,501	4.4				

=== 2009 election ===
Federal election (2009): Rostock
Notes:	Blue background denotes the winner of the electorate vote. Pink background denotes a candidate elected from their party list. Yellow background denotes an electorate win by a list member, or other incumbent. A ✓ or ✗ denotes status of any incumbent, win or lose respectively.						
Party	Candidate	Votes	%	±%	Party votes	%	±%
Left	Steffen Bockhahn	41,539	32.3	▲10.0	40,045	31.1	▲7.2
CDU	Peter Stein	34,517	26.9	▲1.3	34,759	27.0	▲4.2
SPD	✗ Christian Kleiminger	25,389	19.8	▼17.9	23,223	18.0	▼20.9
Greens	Harald Terpe	13,727	10.7	▲1.3	10,772	8.4	▲2.9
FDP	Hagen Reinhold	8,517	6.6	▲2.5	12,234	9.5	▲4.1
Pirates					4,215	3.3	
NPD	Franziska Vorpahl	3,215	2.5		2,999	2.3	▲0.3
Independent	Hartmut Rusin	565	0.4				
MLPD	Renate Voß	554	0.4	▼0.4	324	0.3	▼0.2
Independent	Gabriele Radloff	479	0.4				
REP					177	0.1	
Informal votes		2,157			1,911		
Total valid votes		128,502			128,748		
Turnout		130,659	65.8	▼6.2			
Left gain from SPD	Majority	7,022	5.5				

=== 2005 election ===
Federal election (2005):Rostock
Notes:	Blue background denotes the winner of the electorate vote. Pink background denotes a candidate elected from their party list. Yellow background denotes an electorate win by a list member, or other incumbent. A ✓ or ✗ denotes status of any incumbent, win or lose respectively.						
Party	Candidate	Votes	%	±%	Party votes	%	±%
SPD	Christian Kleiminger	51,623	37.7	▼7.2	53,531	38.9	▼8.6
CDU	Eckhardt Rehberg	35,053	25.6	▲3.1	31,419	22.8	▲0.2
Left	Steffen Bockhahn	30,578	22.3	▲4.1	32,859	23.9	▲5.9
Greens	Harald Terpe	12,917	9.4	▲1.2	7,483	5.4	▲0.7
FDP	Helga Kentzler	5,656	4.1	▲0.1	7,436	5.4	▲0.5
NPD					2,768	2.0	▲1.4
GRAUEN					1,205	0.9	
MLPD	Uwe Wagner	1,179	0.9		576	0.4	
PBC					313	0.2	
Informal votes		2,562			1,978		
Total valid votes		137,006			137,590		
Turnout		139,568	72.0	▲0.3			
SPD hold	Majority	16,570	12.1				
