= Warnemünde Church =

Coordinates: 54°10′37″N 12°05′06″E

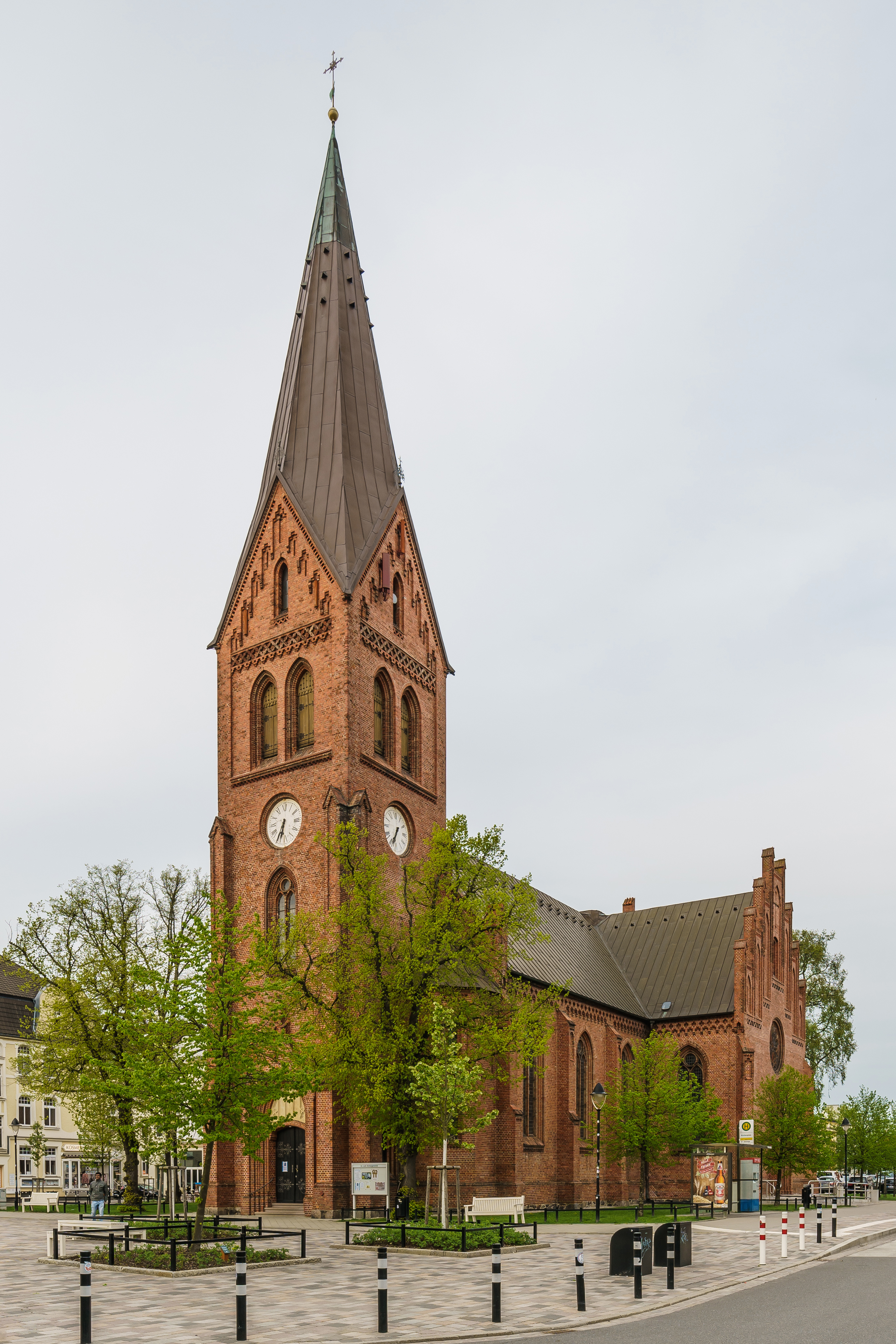
Church from the south-west

Warnemünde Church is a neogothic building in Warnemünde, which is a part of the hanseatic city of Rostock. Construction of the current brick building began in 1866 and the church was consecrated in 1871. The church of Warnemünde stands for over one hundred years in the middle of the town and is the center of the Evangelical Lutheran congregation. For the community along with many guests it is a place of rest and prayer. But it has also even given protection from flooding. The maritime atmosphere is shown by the special votive ships inside.

== History ==
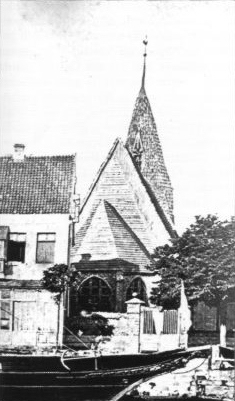
Previous church, demolished 1872

The old church, which burned down twice, stood on the Warnow riverside for around 600 years and was demolished, after completion of the new church, in 1872. The construction of the new church began in 1866 on the western side of the old fisherman's village, and it was ready in 1871 the church. The new building, designed by architect, Krueger of Schwerin, and built by master builder Wachenhusen of Rostock, was erected on the western outskirts of the settlement, but nowadays is the centre of the town. The church therefore is in fact relatively young, but decorated with major furnishings that were inherited from the earlier building. Originally three narrow lancet windows were planned for the transept facades. But the principal, Frederick Francis II, Grand Duke of Mecklenburg, patron of Warnemünde Church insisted that a single large window would be much more appropriate; the architects designed the rose windows, which can still be seen today.

== Furnishings ==
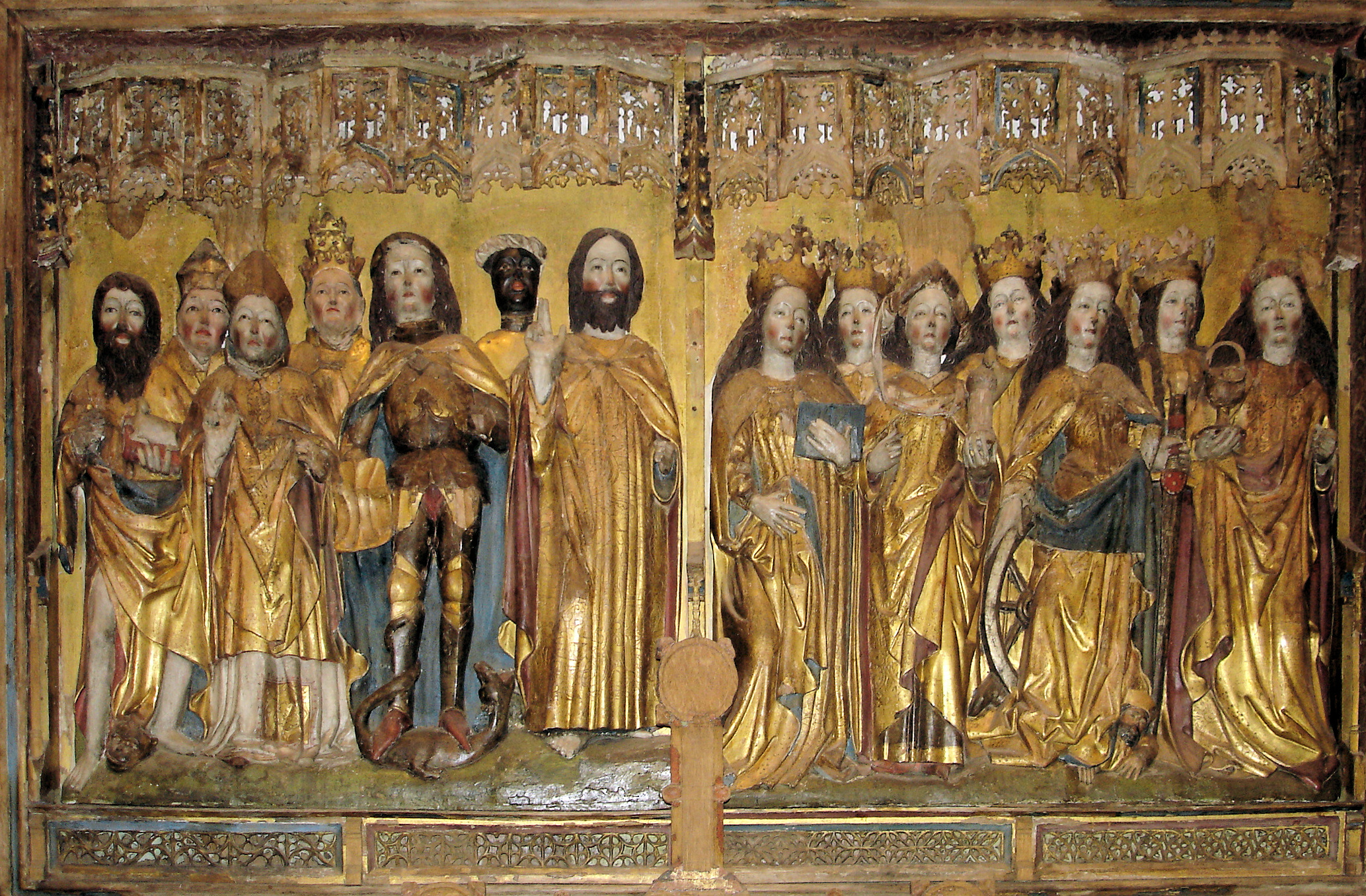
Middle of Altar

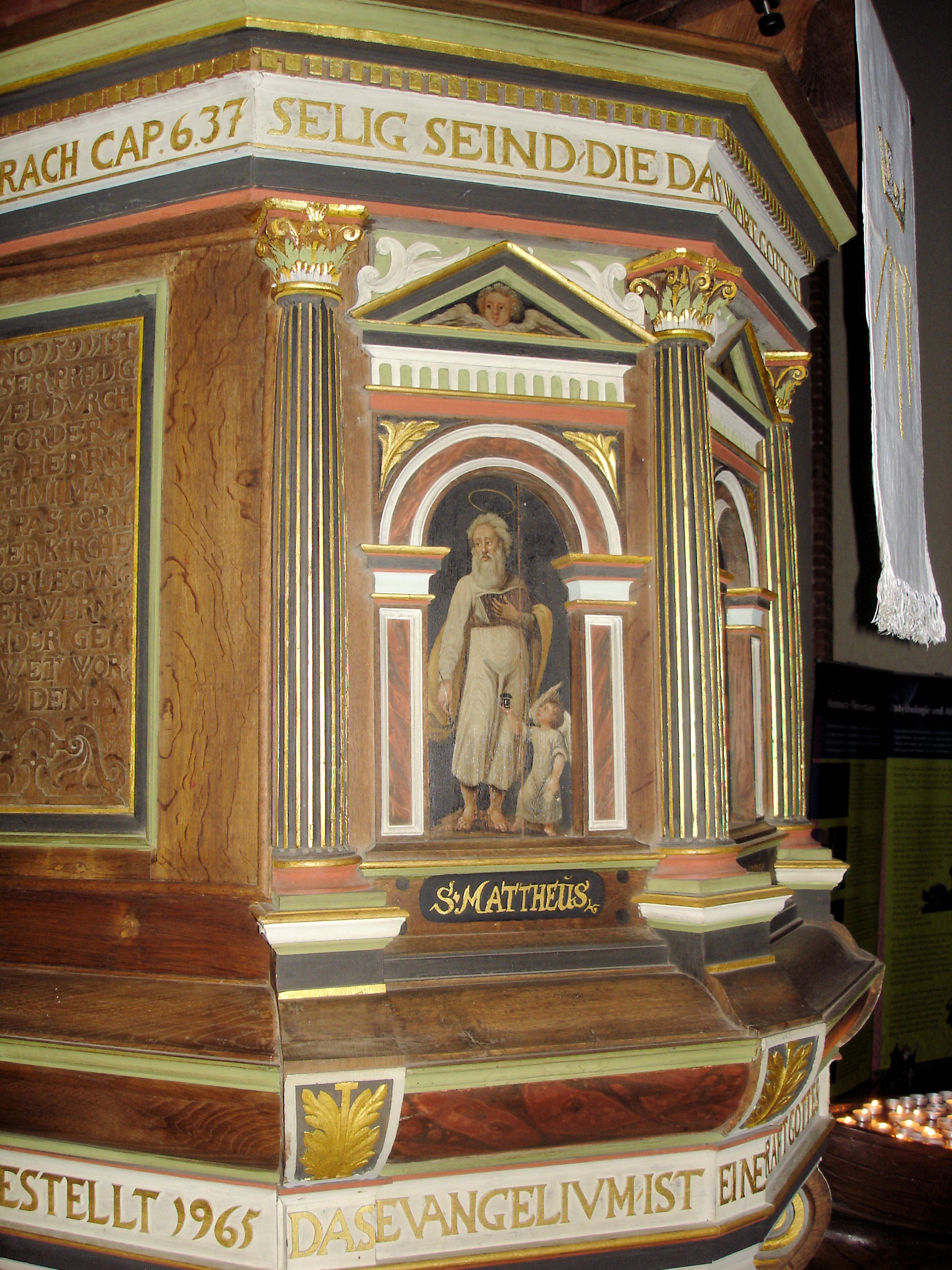
Renaissance Pulpit

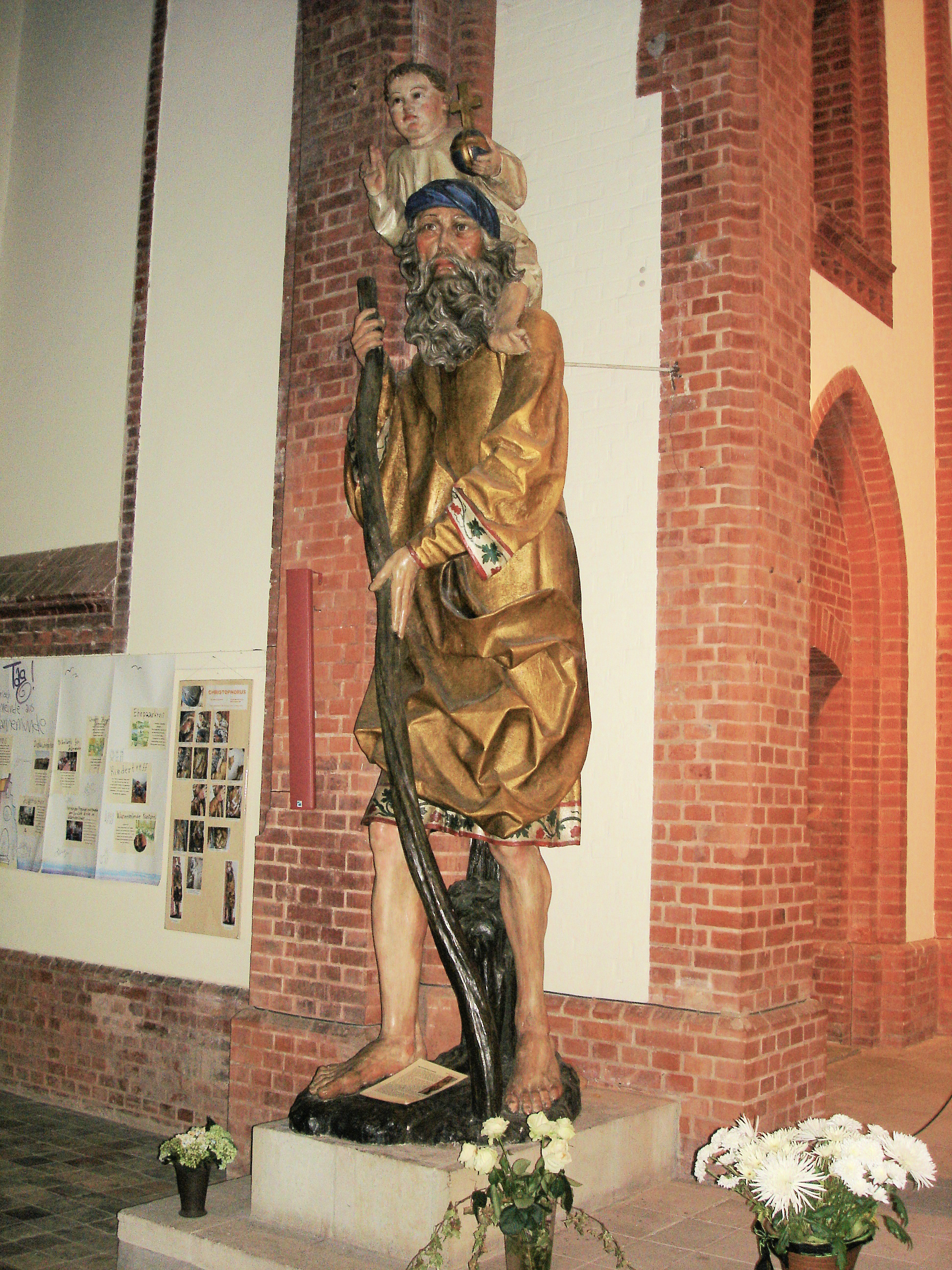
Saint Christopher

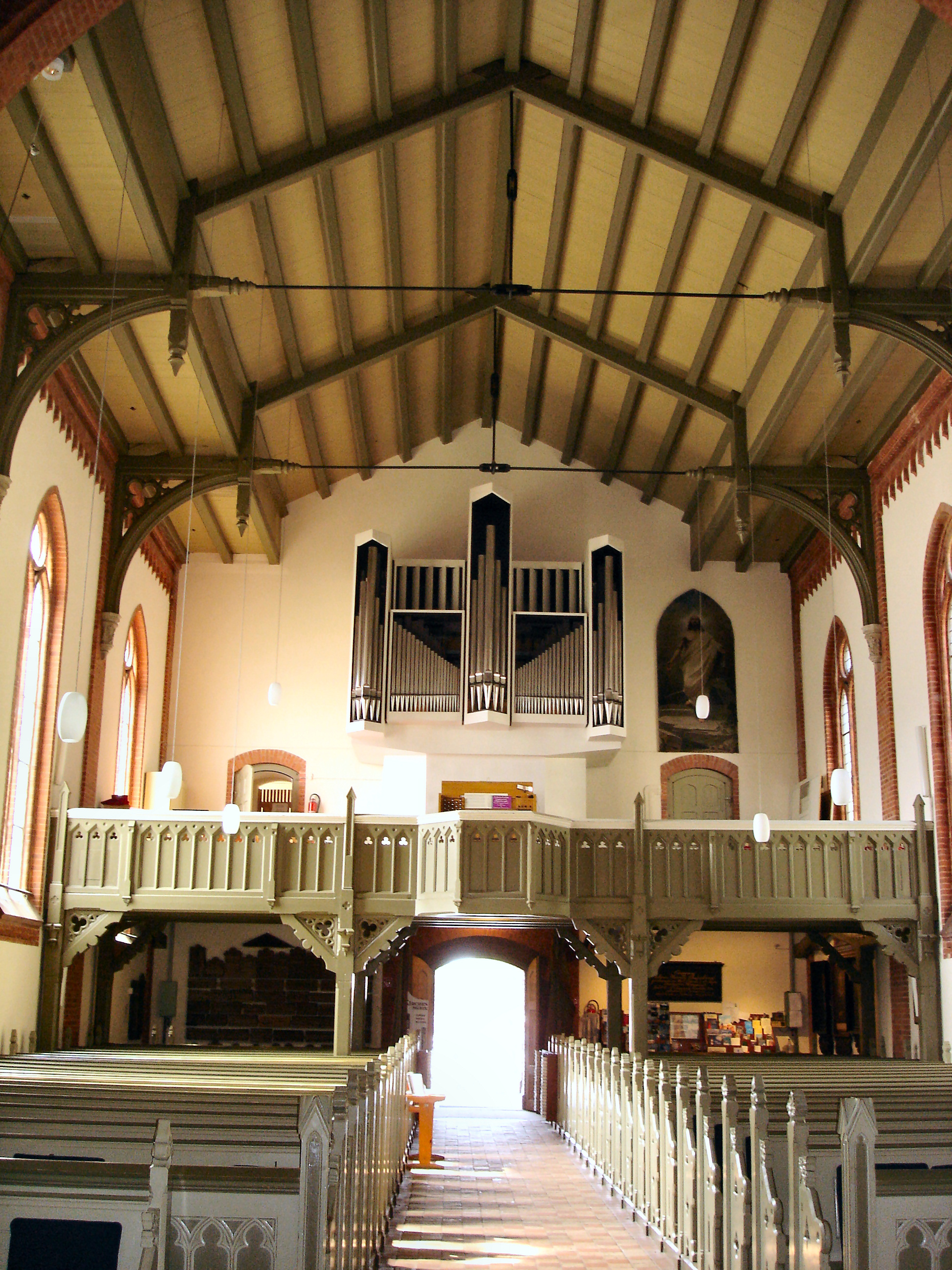
Nave with organ on the west wall

Altar

The Gothic carved altar from around 1475 – rumours say it was taken from a shipwreck – is the work of an unknown master from Gdańsk. It was restored in 2010. In the central shrine the figures are next to and behind each other in an odd way, without being connected by a common theme as was usual at that time. A pillar in the middle divides them into two groups. In the front row on the left the Saviour blessing, St. George, St. Nicholas (probably) and John the Baptist can be seen. Behind it Saint Maurice as a Moor, St. Gregory as pope and a bishop (perhaps the St. Erasmus). In the front row on the right there are Mary, the mother of Jesus, Mary Magdalene with ointment jar (or is it the St. Barbara with her tower ?), St. Catherine with the wheel and sword and St. Dorothea with roses and the cup. Behind them are seen three crowned female saints, of which only the St. Agnes with the lamb can be determined. In the right wing one can see five Acts: of which Paul and James the Elder are pilgrims, Judas Thaddeus with club and two female saints, including St. Elizabeth recognizable on the pitcher and the plate. Below is a deacon, probably the St. Lawrence. In the left wing are the other seven apostles and St. Stephen with three stones in the arm. Of the apostles only the four top can be determined: Peter, Andrew, John and Bartholomew. On the predella above the table are in the middle: Christ crowned with thorns, right the St. Elizabeth and Mary Magdalene, left St. Agnes and St. Barbara with a chalice. The crucifix in front of the altarpiece is the oldest art work in the church. It was created in the first third of the 15th century and was already in the same spot in the old fishermen's church.

Pulpit

The renaissance pulpit was built in 1591 by local wood carver Hans Wegner. After the demolition of the old church in 1872 the pulpit was given to the Rostock Museum, restored and completed in 1965, and replaced in the church.

Saint Christopher

From around the same time as the altar is the statue of Saint Christopher (Greek: christos pherein, "Christ bearer") with the Christ child on his shoulder. This portrait was traditionally adored with special affection by the Warnemünder: This saint found his life's mission in helping people overcoming waters, an activity that was also a business of the local fishermen. The figure is made of oak and is 3.72 meters high. In the old church it had its place on the northern wall of the choir, under the Arc de Triomphe. In 2007 the statue was restored. The name of this saint is often seen in public life: For example, the rescue helicopters in Germany, have the radio call Christopher. The Warnemünde church mouse is named Christopher and knows as a "mouse" how to teach the children pieces of information in the community newsletter.

Organ

It was built in 1975 by the Voigt Company from Bad Liebenwerda. The modern prospectus with the crystal form of the organ case was fitted into the neo-Gothic church. It has 1587 organ pipes and 22 stops, which are distributed over two manuals and pedal. At the general overhaul in 1995, the existing pneumatic stop control (with two combinations) was upgraded. Now the organ features a mechanical stop action connected to an electronic translator that has 512 combinations, divided into eight levels with eight main groups in eight combinations each and four Presets. The tremulants are electronically controlled and variable in frequency from out of the console.

The table positive organ in the sanctuary was built in 2002, also by the organ builder Voigt. A special feature of this small organ are the wooden pipes, of which the smallest is 4 cm long. Instead of standing, all pipes are lying in the instrument Besides she is transposable a semitone up and down and can be regulated between it in the pitch due to wind pressure change.

Clockwork from the old church of Warnemünde

Since May 2007 a 300-year-old clockwork clock stands in the north wing of the church. It dates from the previous building, which was demolished in 1872, and had been stored by the Cultural History Museum Rostock. Three years ago it was found there by an expert and identified as that, displayed inside the church on the gallery, showing the time in a special way because there was no hour hand. The sky-blue dial and the hands are missing. This type of clock was invented in England; today there is only one similar copy, in Dover.

House marks

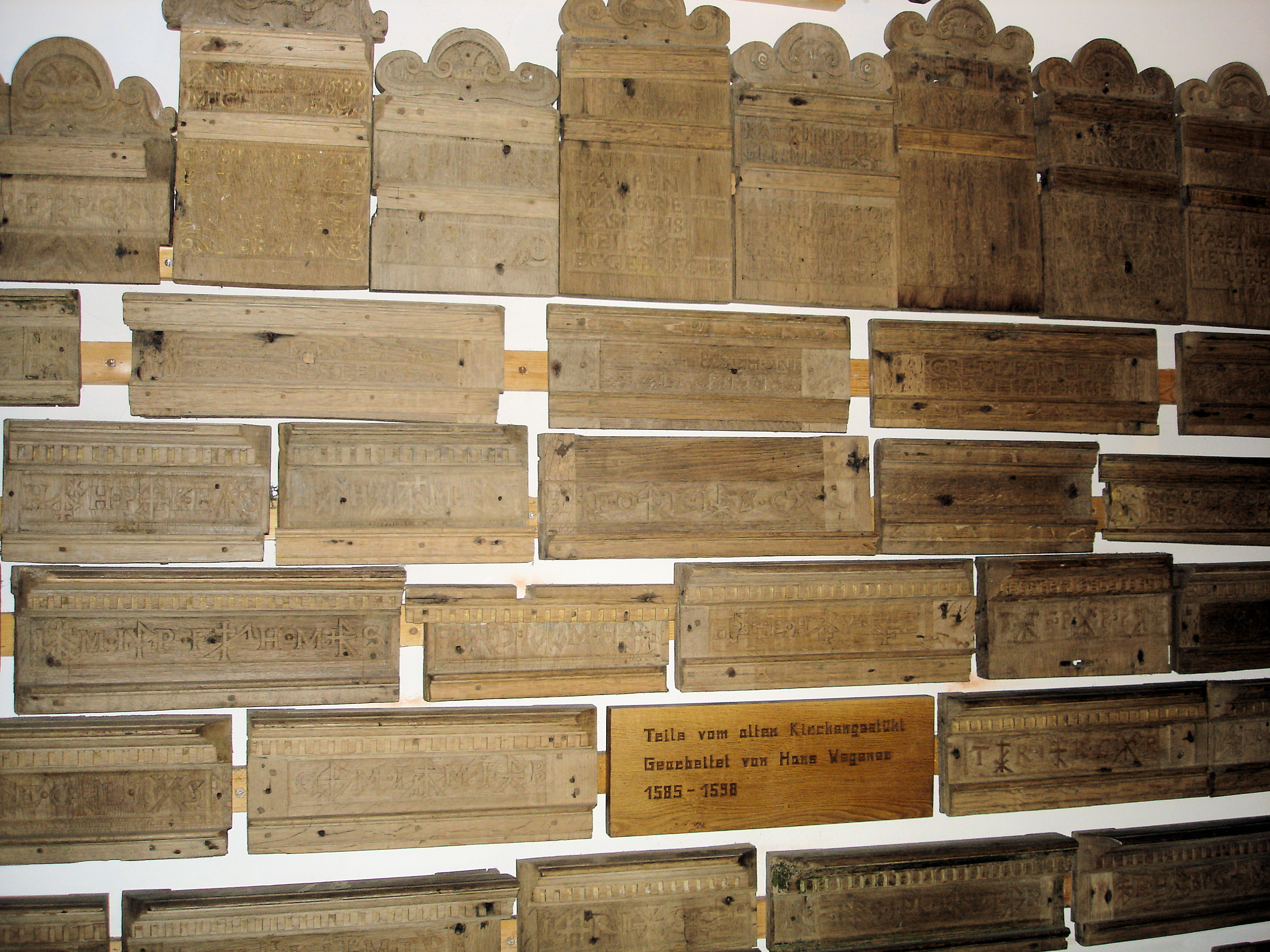
Old house marks

The objects preserved from the old church of Warnemünde include the house marks of the locals, carved once into the pews. About 60 pieces of wood, collected by a working group and then combined into a display on the wall at the right of the entrance. The house marks are to visit for free in today's church.

Votive ships

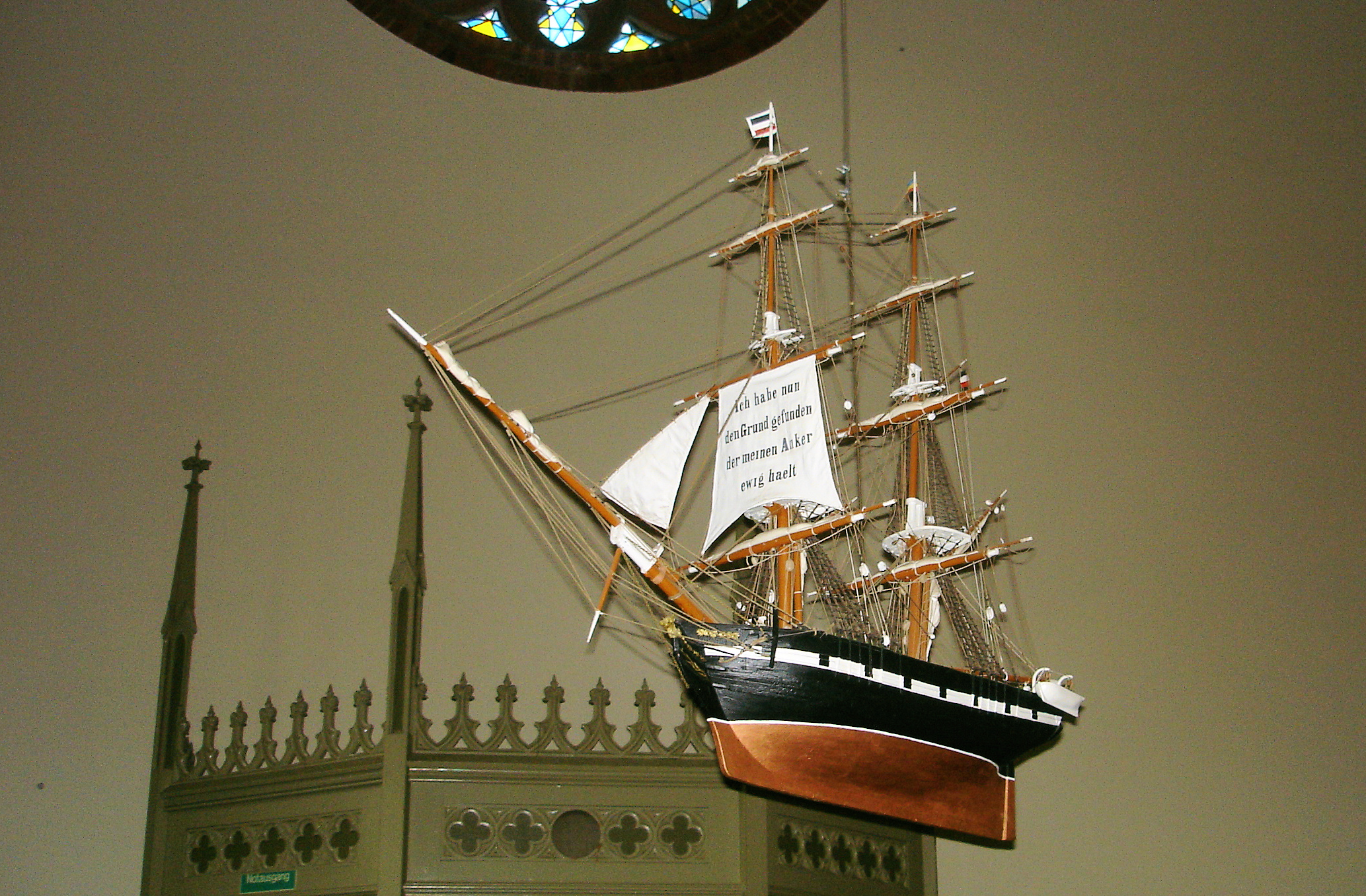
Votive ship

Visitors to the church of Warnemünde are struck by two items that are not found in many churches. In the aisles are seen two votive ships that the parish was given by the Warnemünde harbor pilots David and Jantzen. Votive ships can be found in some churches of northern German towns (also in Ahrenshoop, Dierhagen, Wismar and Wolgast); they are a votive offering often given to churches in gratitude for the preservation and protection on the high seas. In the south part of the transept hangs the barque "Marie" built in 1887 by Captain Henry Stuhr and in the north part the "Schnau", a brig from the 18th century, which was made in 1825 by maritime pilot Jungmann. On the sail of the "Schnau" is the inscription "Now I have found the seabed where my anchor holds forever." This known Choralvers was written in 1726 by the Moravian pastor Johann Andreas Rothe. The song refers to a ground which is fixed and unchangeable, which is also true when "earth and heaven goes down.": "Who has founded on him, anchored on a solid foundation of strength that is independent of the changes in history and the lives of people. This stable, steady basis is the divine gospel of our Lord Jesus Christ. Who uses it has, in quiet and stormy days, at home and on rough Sea a foothold, that man in life and death can trust."

Warnemünde grave stone

Partially hidden in the grass in front of the east chancel of the church is a 2.65-meter × 1.70-meter large stone slab, which probably was in the 19th century on the sidewalk to the parsonage. It is the oldest hand-worked stone in Warnemünde. Recognizable on it are traces of the working process that clearly identify it as a gravestone. Presumably, the stone slab was used for the first time for a burial in the 14th century, but the oldest inscriptions were chiselled off and the slab was reused. Originally-made symbols are still visible, with the four evangelists' symbols in the corners: Top left, a bull (Luke), top right, a lion (Mark), bottom left, an eagle (John) and bottom right, an angel (Matthew). This typical medieval design was preserved as an apparently high-ranking lord was buried in the former church, which is still recognizable by the letters "Anno Domini [...] obiit dominus [...]" (died in the year ... Lord ...). This slab has experienced four other overhauls before it ceased to be used because burials in the churches were abandoned for reasons of hygiene in the mid-19th century. Now it will be tried to preserve the plate and the few recognizable elements to it. It would first have to be erected to prevent the collection of rainwater. This is as a future project of the Booster club of the church already scheduled.
