= Eva-Maria Kröger =

German politician

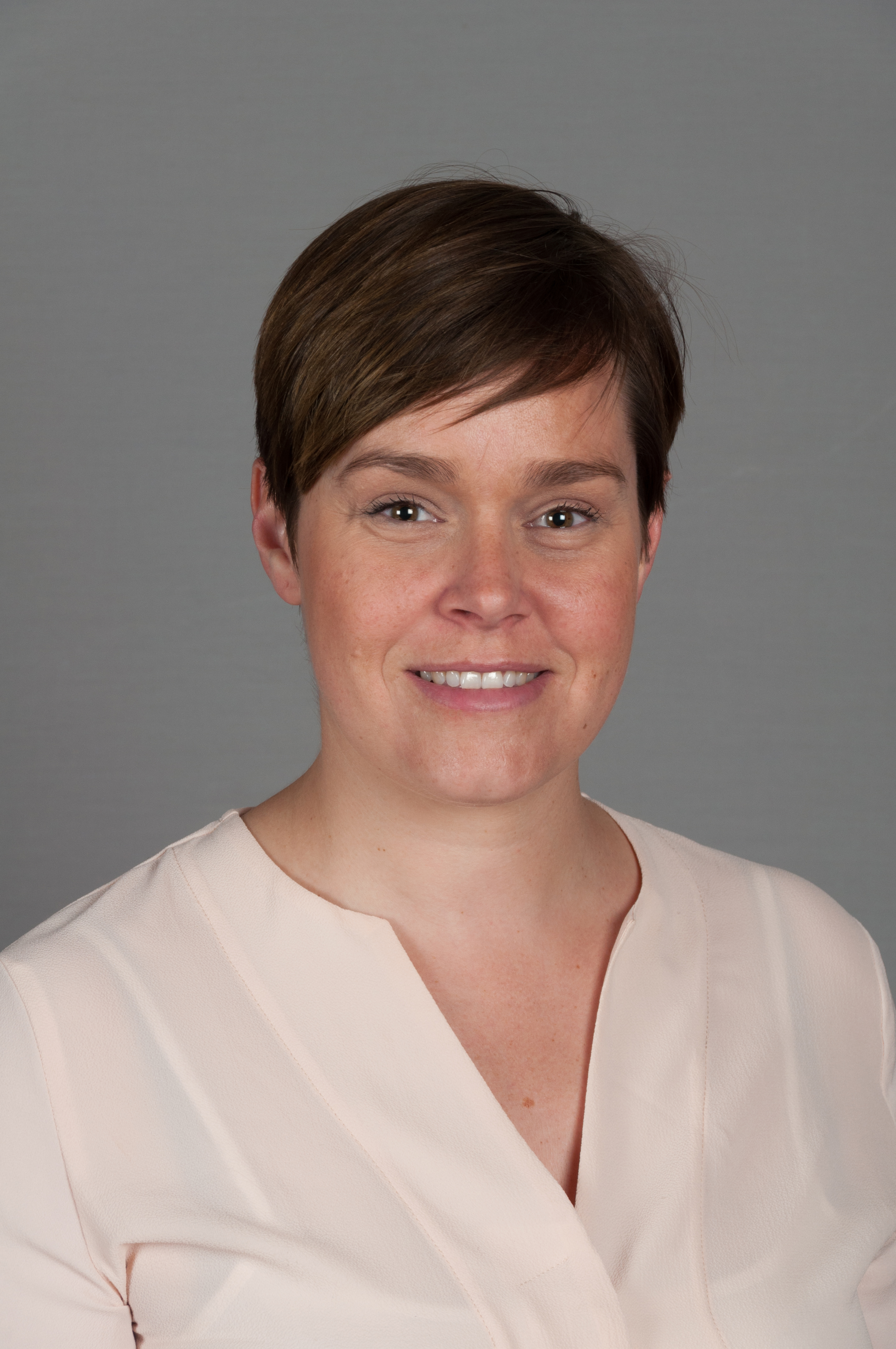
- Kröger in 2017

Mayor of Rostock
- Incumbent
- Assumed office 1 February 2023
- Preceded by: Claus Ruhe Madsen

Member of the Landtag of Mecklenburg-Vorpommern
- In office 4 October 2016 – 1 February 2023
- Succeeded by: Dirk Bruhn

Personal details
- Born: Eva-Maria Kröger; 16 June 1982 (age 44) Rostock, East Germany
- Party: The Left
- Education: University of Rostock; University of Tübingen

Eva-Maria Kröger (born 16 June 1982) is a German politician of The Left who is serving as Mayor of Rostock, the largest city in Mecklenburg-Vorpommern, since February 2023. She was previously a member of the Landtag of Mecklenburg-Vorpommern since 2016, and leader of The Left faction in the Rostock city council since 2010.

== Education and personal life ==
Kröger grew up as an only child in the Dierkow neighbourhood of Rostock, a 1980s GDR-era housing development. Her mother Kerstin is an elementary school teacher and her father Robert a retired police officer. Kröger graduated from the Goethe-Gymnasium in 2002. The same year, she began studying political science and public law at the University of Rostock, graduating with a bachelor's degree in 2005. She then studied at the University of Tübingen, where she studied comparative government with a focus on the European Union. She graduated with a master's degree in 2008. After working in Mannheim, Eva-Maria Kröger moved back to Rostock the same year. From 2007 to 2009 she worked as a freelance journalist. She later worked as a staffer for The Left in the Bundestag, first from 2009 to 2013 for Steffen Bockhahn, who had been Kröger's classmate at the University of Rostock. From 2013 to 2016, she worked for Heidrun Bluhm.

Kröger had a daughter at the age of eighteen. She was married to Kay Spieß, former state director of The Left in Mecklenburg-Vorpommern, from 2012 until his death in 2018. She later began a relationship with an employee at the Schwerin ministry of justice.

== Political career ==
Kröger joined The Left in 2009. She was elected to the Rostock Bürgerschaft (city council) the same year, and became leader of the party faction there in 2010. In 2014, she was elected chairwoman of the Rostock party branch. From 2013 to 2016 she also chaired the supervisory board of the Volkstheater Rostock.

Kröger was elected to the Landtag of Mecklenburg-Vorpommern in the 2016 state election, placed third on The Left's state list. She was re-elected in the 2021 election in seventh place. She also ran in the Rostock III constituency in both elections, placing second with approximately 20.5% of the vote each time. In the Landtag, she was party spokeswoman for culture, media, housing and construction, digitization, petitions and queer issues.

Kröger ran as The Left's candidate in the early Rostock mayoral election in November 2022, held following the resignation of Claus Ruhe Madsen. In the first round, she placed first with 25.3% and proceeded to a runoff against Michael Ebert, an independent supported by the Christian Democratic Union, Independent Citizens for Rostock, and Free Democratic Party. After the first round, she was endorsed by the Social Democratic Party, Greens, and seven of the independent candidates who ran in the first round. Kröger was elected mayor in the runoff on 27 November, winning 58.4% of votes. She became the second female mayor of Rostock after Ida Schillen, who served only in an acting capacity; and the first female mayor elected in her own right.

Kröger took office for a seven-year term on 1 February 2023. She resigned from the Landtag the same day, and was succeeded by Dirk Bruhn.

== Electoral record ==
2022 Rostock mayoral election
Party	Candidate	Votes (First round)	%	Votes (Second round)	%	+/-
Die Linke	Eva-Maria Kröger	18,878	25.3	36,545	58.4	▲
Independent (Note: supported by CDU, FDP, and Independent Citizens for Rostock)	Michael Ebert	17,591	23.6	26,082	41.6	▲
Social Democratic Party (SPD)	Carmen-Alina Botezatu	12,338	16.5			
Greens	Claudia Müller	6,410	8.6			
Alternative for Germany	Michael Meister	4,812	6.5			
Independent	Jörg Kibellus	3,835	5.1			
Independent	Jens Kaufmann	3,007	4.0			
Independent	Robert Uhde	1,807	2.4			
Independent	Karol Langickel	1,442	1.9			
Independent	Holger Luckstein	1,182	1.9			
Independent	Nils Burmeister	1,109	1.5			
German Beerdrinkers Union	Rebecca Thoß	669	0.9			
Independent	Niklas Zimathis	453	0.6			
Independent	Roland Ulrich	368	0.5			
Independent	Matthias Bräuer	312	0.4			
Independent	Kai Oppermann	196	0.3			
Independent	Alina Kreis	155	0.2			
Total		74,564	99.3	62,627	99.0	▼0.3
Invalid votes		495	0.7	602	1.0	▲0.3
Voter turnout		75,059	43.7	63,229	36.9	▼6.8
Eligible voters		171,883		171,462		
