= Christine Lucyga =

German politician

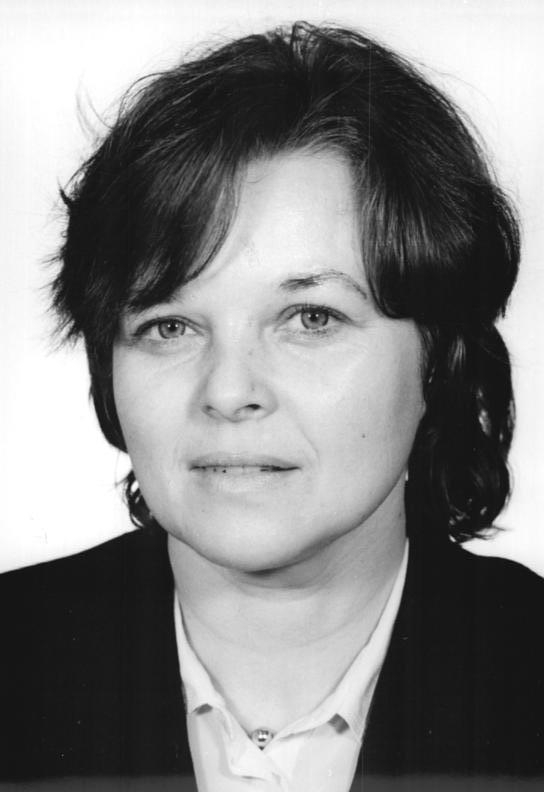
- Lucyga in 1990

Member of the Bundestag
- In office 3 October 1990 – 18 October 2005
- Preceded by: Constituency established
- Succeeded by: Christian Kleiminger
- Constituency: Volkskammer (1990); Rostock (1990–2005)

Member of the Volkskammer; for Rostock
- In office 5 April 1990 – 2 October 1990
- Preceded by: Constituency established
- Succeeded by: Constituency abolished

Personal details
- Born: 6 April 1944 (age 82) Kolberg, Pomerania, Germany
- Party: Social Democratic
- Other political affiliations: SPD in the GDR (1989–1990)
- Education: University of Rostock

Christine Lucyga (born 6 April 1944) is a German politician of the Social Democratic Party (SPD) and former member of the East German Volkskammer (April–October 1990) and the Bundestag (1990–2005).

Lucyga was born in Kolberg, Pomerania (today Kołobrzeg, Poland) and grew up in Rostock, East Germany after her hometown became part of Poland after World War II.

She studied Slavonic and Spanish studies at the University of Rostock and made her doctorate on literature of Latin America in 1980. Between 1969 and 1989 she worked as a teacher of foreign languages at the nautical school at Warnemünde and the Rostock University.

In September 1989 Lucyga joined the opposition party Neues Forum and in late 1989 the Social Democratic Party of Germany. She was elected as the Volkskammer delegate of Rostock in the first free election in East Germany in March 1990 and became a member of the German Bundestag after the reunification of Germany in October 1990. Lucyga was reelected in 1994, 1998, 2002 and abandoned to candidate in 2005.

== Sources ==
- biography on Bundestag.de
