= Dasse =

Dasse is a surname. Notable people with the surname include:

- Bonnie Dasse (born 1959), American shot putter
- Claude Dasse (born 1964), French bobsledder
- Stéphane Agbre Dasse (born 1989), Burkinabé footballer

== See also ==
- Hasse
