= Hasse =

Hasse is both a surname and a given name. Notable people with the name include:

Surname:

- Clara H. Hasse (1880–1926), American botanist
- Helmut Hasse (1898–1979), German mathematician
- Henry Hasse (1913–1977), US writer of science fiction
- Johann Adolph Hasse (1699–1783), German composer
- Maria Hasse (1921–2014), German mathematician
- Peter Hasse (c. 1585–1640), German organist and composer

Given name or nickname:

- Hans Alfredson (born 1931), Swedish actor, film director, writer and comedian
- Hans Backe (born 1952), Swedish football manager
- Hasse Borg (born 1953), Swedish footballer
- Hasse Börjes (born 1948), Swedish speed skater
- Hasse Ekman (1915-2004), Swedish film director and actor
- Hans Wind (1919–1995), Finnish flying ace

== See also ==
- Hasse bound, on the number of points on an elliptic curve
- Hasse diagram, a diagram used in set theory
