= Peter Stein (politician) =

German politician

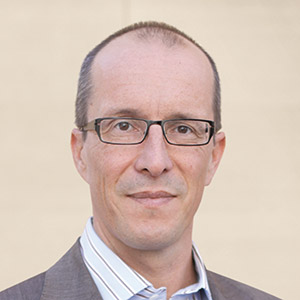
- Stein in 2014

Member of the Bundestag; for Rostock – Landkreis Rostock II
- In office 22 October 2013 – 26 October 2021
- Preceded by: Steffen Bockhahn
- Succeeded by: Katrin Zschau

Member of the; Landtag of Mecklenburg-Vorpommern; for Bad Doberan II
- In office October 2006 – October 2011
- Preceded by: Volker Schlotmann
- Succeeded by: Volker Schlotmann

Personal details
- Born: 18 January 1968 (age 58) Siegen, West Germany
- Party: Christian Democratic Union
- Children: 2
- Education: Technical University of Dortmund

Peter Stein (born 18 January 1968) is a German politician of the Christian Democratic Union (CDU) who served as a member of the Bundestag from the state of Mecklenburg-Vorpommern from 2013 to 2021.

== Early career ==
Born in Siegen, North Rhine-Westphalia, Stein studied urban planning at the Technical University of Dortmund before moving for the Rostock city administration.

== Political career ==
He unsuccessfully contested Rostock at the 2009 federal election.

Stein first became a member of the Bundestag in the 2013 German federal election. He was a member of the Committee on Economic Cooperation and Development and the Committee on Economic and Energy Affairs.

In addition to his committee assignments, Stein served as deputy chairman of the Parliamentary Friendship Group for Relations with the Maghreb States.

Stein lost his seat in the 2021 federal election.

== Life after politics ==
From 2022 to 2023, Stein worked as lobbyist for church-affiliated aid organization Brot für die Welt.

== Political positions ==
In June 2017, Stein voted against his parliamentary group’s majority and in favor of Germany’s introduction of same-sex marriage.
