= Katrin Zschau =

German politician

- Zschau in 2021

Member of the Bundestag; for Rostock – Landkreis Rostock II
- In office 26 October 2021 – 25 March 2025
- Preceded by: Peter Stein
- Succeeded by: Seat vacant

Personal details
- Born: 9 June 1976 (age 50) Greifswald, East Germany
- Party: Social Democratic
- Children: 2
- Education: University of Rostock

Katrin Zschau (born 9 June 1976) is a German politician of the Social Democratic Party (SPD) who has been serving as a member of the Bundestag from the 2021 German federal election to 2025 German federal election, representing the constituency of Rostock – Landkreis Rostock II.

== Political career ==
Zschau joined the SPD in 2018. She became a member of the Bundestag in the 2021 elections. In parliament, she has since been serving on the Committee on Education, Research and Technology Assessment and the Committee on Economic Affairs and Climate Action. In February 2025, she lost her seat in Bundestag.
