= Bernd Klaus Buchholz =

German politician and lawyer

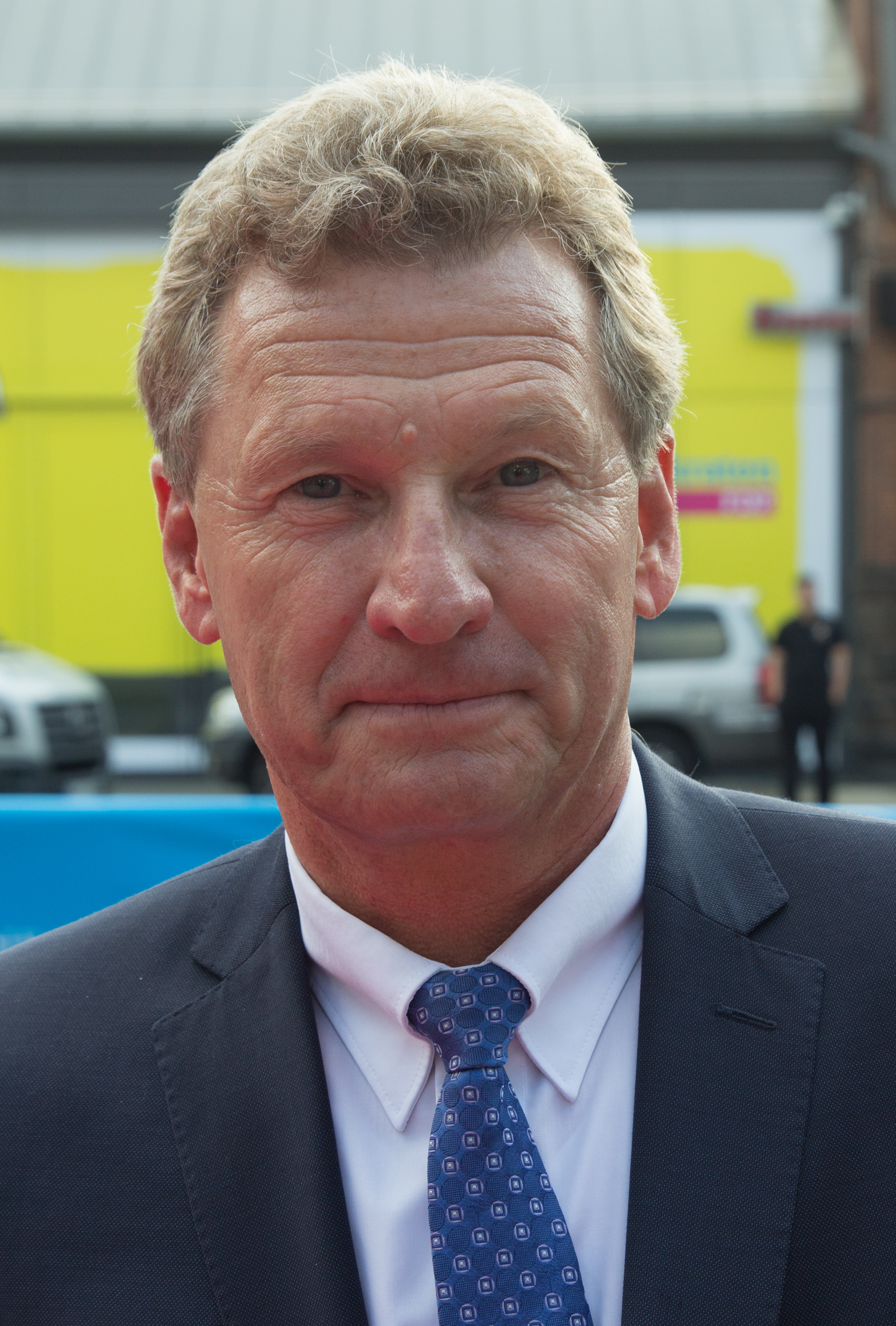

Member of the Landtag of Schleswig-Holstein
- Incumbent
- Assumed office 7 June 2022

Schleswig-Holstein Minister of Economic Affairs, Transport, Employment, Technology and Tourism
- In office 28 June 2017 – 29 June 2022
- Appointed by: Daniel Günther
- Preceded by: Reinhard Meyer
- Succeeded by: Claus Ruhe Madsen

Member of the Landtag of Schleswig-Holstein
- In office 1992–1996

Personal details
- Born: 2 November 1961 (age 64) Berlin, West Germany
- Party: Free Democratic Party of Germany

Bernd Klaus Buchholz (born 2 November 1961) is a German politician and lawyer. He served as Schleswig-Holstein Minister of Economic Affairs, Transport, Employment, Technology and Tourism.

== Early life ==
Buchholz was born in West-Berlin to shopkeeper parents. He studied Law and Economics in Berlin, Erlangen and Kiel.

== Career ==
Buchholz was publishing manager at Gruner + Jahr from 1996 to 1998 and publishing Manager at Hamburger Morgenpost from 1998 to 1999. He became publishing Manager for the German magazine Stern from 1999 to 2000 and its Manager from 2000 to 2004. From 2004, he was a member of the board and Manager at Gruner + Jahr. From 2009 to 2012, he was chairman of Bertelsmann. He worked as a lawyer for the law firm CausaConcilio from 2014 to 2017.

=== Politics ===
After becoming a member of the Free Democratic Party of Germany in 1981, he became chairman of the Schleswig-Holstein Young Liberals in 1987, an office he held until 1990. From 1989 to 2007 he was a boardmember to the Schleswig-Holstein Free Democratic Party. He has been his Party's deputy chairman since 2013.

Buchholz was a Member of the Schleswig-Holstein Landtag from 1992 to 1996. He became Schleswig-Holstein Minister of Economic Affairs, Transport, Employment, Technology and Tourism as a member of Daniel Günther's Cabinet in 2017 and represents Schleswig-Holstein as a member of the Bundesrat since then.

He was his Party's Lead Candidate for the 2022 Schleswig-Holstein state election. He subsequently was elected a Member of the Landtag of Schleswig-Holstein.
