= Claus Ruhe Madsen =

German politician

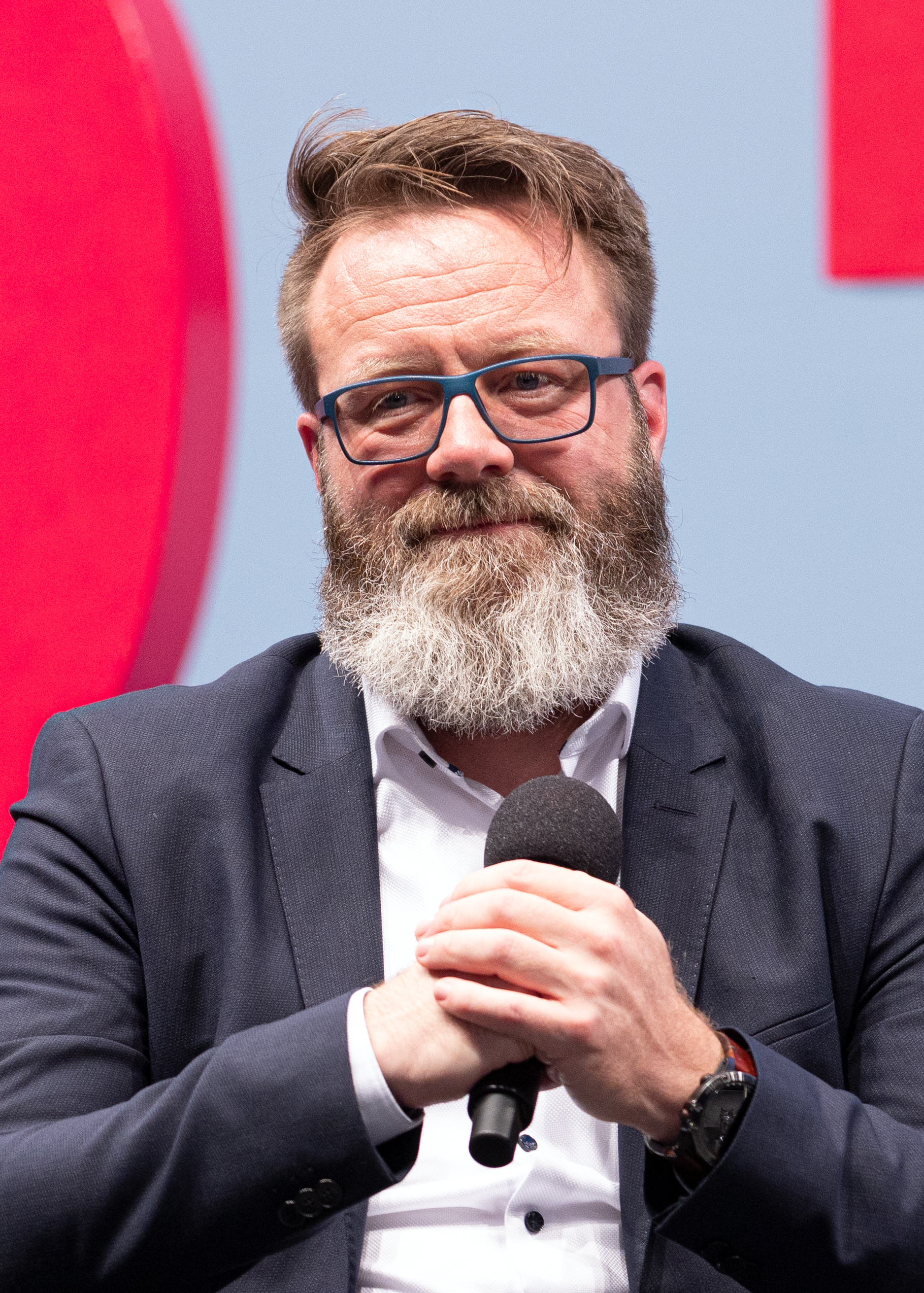
- Madsen in 2021

Minister for Economics, Transport, Labour, Technology and Tourism in Schleswig-Holstein
- Incumbent
- Assumed office 29 June 2022
- Preceded by: Bernd Buchholz

Mayor of Rostock
- In office 1 September 2019 – 29 June 2022
- Preceded by: Roland Methling
- Succeeded by: Chris von Wrycz Rekowski (acting); Eva-Maria Kröger

Personal details
- Born: Claus Ruhe Madsen; 27 August 1972 (age 54) Copenhagen, Denmark
- Party: Christian Democratic Union of Germany (CDU)

Claus Ruhe Madsen (born 27 August 1972) is a Danish and German entrepreneur who is active as a politician in Germany. He is currently serving as Minister for Economics, Transport, Labour, Technology and Tourism in the Schleswig-Holstein state government since June 2022. He was previously Mayor of Rostock, the largest city in Mecklenburg-Vorpommern, from September 2019 until resigning to take up his ministerial post. Prior to entering politics, he was president of the Rostock Chamber of Industry and Commerce and vice-president of the German-Danish Chamber of Commerce in Denmark.

== Professional career and personal life ==
Madsen was born in Copenhagen grew up in a housing development north of the city. At the age of 12, he started his first company mowing lawns in the neighbourhood. Soon after, he moved with his family to Fjand, a settlement between the North Sea and Nissum Fjord with just nine inhabitants before the family moved in. Because of the long distance to school, he moved into the boarding school section of the public high school in Struer at the age of 14. He graduated from high school in 1992 at the top of his class. He then worked on a fishing trawler for six months. He wanted to join the Royal Life Guards, but chose instead to travel abroad at his parents' insistence.

The trip abroad, originally planned to last a year, was to the Ruhr area in Germany. Madsen was employed there from 1992 to 1996, first as a salesperson and a year later as branch manager in a furniture store. In mid-1996, he was a self-employed sales representative. He moved to Rostock with his wife in early 1998, where he co-opened the furniture store Möbel Wikinger. By 2019, the company employed around 100 employees at five locations.

In May 2012, Madsen founded the food service company Food and Fun GmbH, which was later renamed Mobilson GmbH. Since 2017, it has also offered motor home rentals. In May 2018, he received an entrepreneur award for his commitment to promoting the image of the city of Rostock. He also owns an ice cream stand and a sausage stand in Rostock. In 2017, Madsen took over the organization of the Hanse-Tour Sonnenschein, an annual cycling event in Mecklenburg-Vorpommern attracting more than 200 participants which raises money for children suffering from cancer and chronic illness.

Madsen served two terms as chairman of the Rostock Chamber of Industry and Commerce from 2013 to 2019, and was vice president of the German-Danish Chamber of Commerce in Denmark from 2014 to 2019. He is a member of the Warnemünde Rotary Club.

Madsen met his wife, who is Finnish, while living in the Ruhr. They have a daughter together.

== Political career ==
In September 2018, Madsen announced his candidacy for the upcoming mayoral election in Rostock. He was able to run despite lacking German citizenship due to the Treaty on the Functioning of the European Union, which grants EU citizens the right to vote and stand in local elections in other EU member states. He was supported by the Christian Democratic Union (CDU) and Free Democratic Party (FDP).

In the leadup to the mayoral election, Madsen was criticised by trade unions as well as the youth branches of both the Social Democrats and Left for underpaying employees at his furniture company by several hundred euros per month. Madsen claimed he could not afford to pay standard wages and that his employees received other perks such as "daycare grants for parents, training, free drinks and occasional bonuses". He also stated that works councils and unionisation are not necessary in small companies such as his. Several employees also came out in defence of Madsen's practices.

In the first round on 26 May 2019, Madsen placed first with 34.6% of votes and proceeded to the runoff against Steffen Bockhahn of The Left, who won 18.9%. For the second round, he was endorsed by the Independent Citizens for Rostock (UFR), party of outgoing mayor Roland Methling. He was elected mayor in the runoff on 16 June, winning 57.1% of votes. He took office in September, becoming the first foreigner to serve as mayor of a major German city.

During the COVID-19 pandemic, Madsen attracted attention for his cautious and unorthodox approach to combating the virus, calling for more flexibility for local authorities to minimise infection while allowing life to continue. These measures were interpreted as the reason for the particularly low number of infections in Rostock. Madsen was a frequent guest on talk shows discussing pandemic policy.

After the 2022 Schleswig-Holstein state election, rumours began circulating that Madsen would become economics minister in the new second Günther cabinet. Günther confirmed speculation on 27 June. The following day, Madsen did the same and announced his resignation as mayor to take up the new post. He resigned on 29 June, just three years into his seven-year term. He was replaced on an acting basis by Chris von Wrycz Rekowski, and an early election held in November to replace him was won by Eva-Maria Kröger.

Madsen took office as Minister for Economics, Transport, Labour, Technology and Tourism on 22 June. He was nominated to the position by the CDU, but remained an independent politician. He joined CDU in 2023.
