= Christian Kleiminger =

German politician

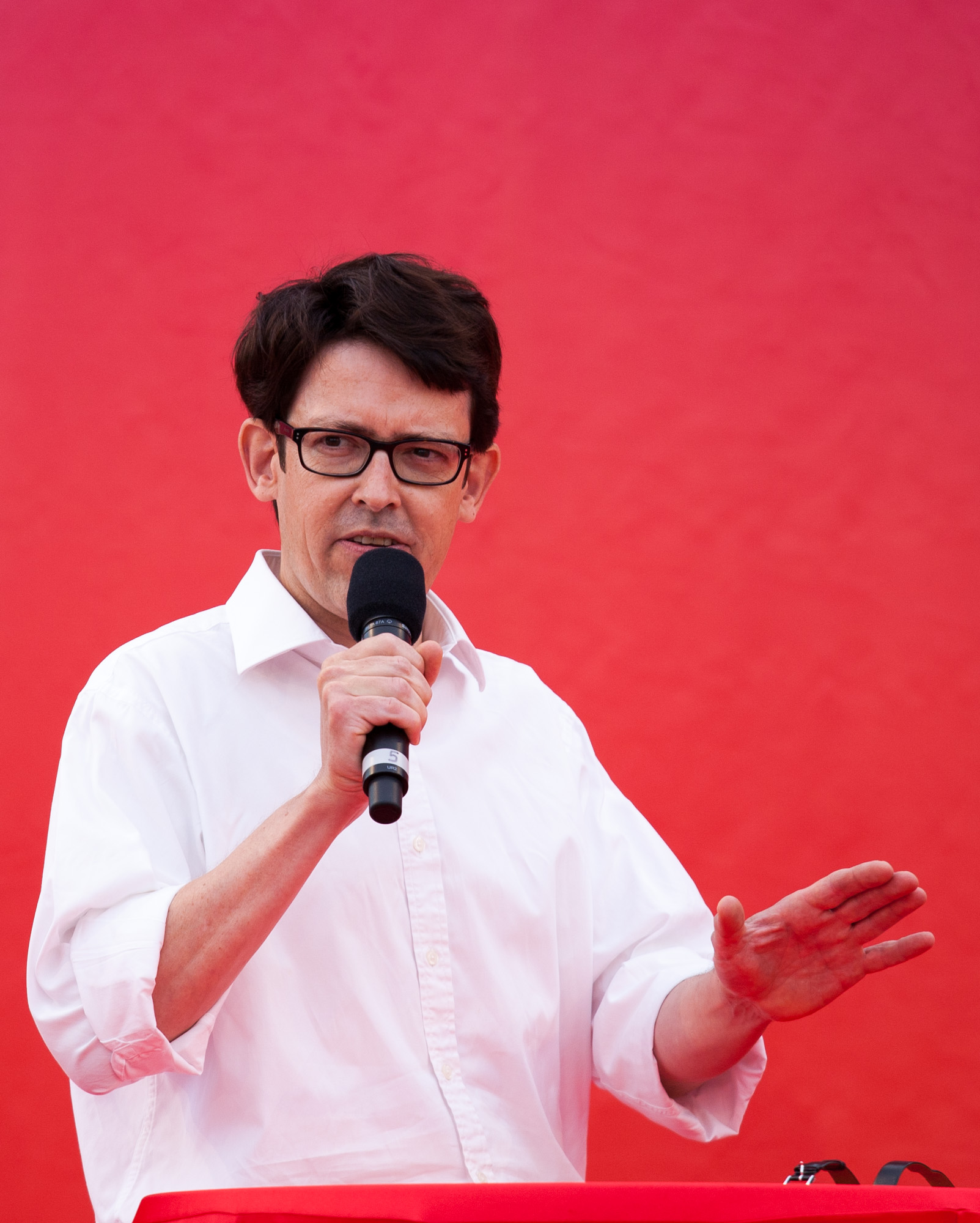
- Kleiminger in 2013

Member of the Bundestag; for Rostock
- In office 18 October 2005 – 27 October 2009
- Preceded by: Christine Lucyga
- Succeeded by: Steffen Bockhahn

Personal details
- Born: 27 December 1965 (age 60) Osnabrück, West Germany
- Party: Social Democratic
- Relatives: Heino Kleiminger (uncle)

Christian Kleiminger (27 December 1965) is a German politician and member of the Social Democratic Party of Germany (SPD). He was a member of The German Bundestag from 2005 until 2009.

== Education ==
After graduating from the Graf-Stauffenberg-Gymnasium in Osnabrück in 1985, Kleiminger completed an apprenticeship as a bank clerk at the former Gewerkschaftsbank Bank für Gemeinwirtschaft (BfG). He then began studying law in 1987, which he completed in 1994 with the first state law examination. Kleiminger then completed his legal clerkship in the district of the Rostock Higher Regional Court. After passing the second state examination in 1996, he settled in Rostock as an independent lawyer.

== Political career ==
Kleiminger became a member of the SPD as a schoolboy in 1983. From January 2005, he was a member of the executive committee of the Rostock SPD district association, and has been district chairman since 28 February 2009. He is co-editor of horizonte, a magazine for social democratic politics in Mecklenburg-Vorpommern.

Christian Kleiminger won the direct mandate in the Rostock parliamentary constituency in the 2005 federal election with 37.7% of the first-past-the-post votes and thus represented this constituency in the Bundestag during the legislative period from 2005 to 2009. He was a member of the Parliamentary Left in the SPD parliamentary group.

As a representative of the German Bundestag, Kleiminger was elected Chairman of the Board of Trustees of the Federal Foundation "Humanitarian Aid for Persons Infected with HIV through Blood Products" (German: Bundesstiftung „Humanitäre Hilfe für durch Blutprodukte HIV-infizierte Personen“) on 15 November 2006 in Bonn. He was a member of the delegation to the German Bundestag.

He participated as a member of the delegation of the Parliamentary Assembly of the Organization for Security and Co-operation in Europe (OSCE-PA) as an observer in the election to the Russian State Duma on 2 December 2007. He subsequently described the parliamentary elections to the media as unfair, citing an economic and personnel superiority of the United Russia party, which is influenced by President Vladimir Putin, because the opposition had had no real chances.

On 15 February 2008 Kleiminger was elected as an assessor to the federal executive committee of the Forum Demokratische Linke 21, a leftist association within the SPD, in Berlin.

In the 2009 Bundestag election, as a direct candidate in the Rostock constituency, he achieved 19.7% of the first-place vote, finishing in third place behind candidates from the Left Party and the CDU, and thus failed to re-enter the Bundestag. This was preceded by an appeal by the former SPD member of the Bundestag for Rostock, Christine Lucyga, not to vote for her successor Kleiminger. A few days before the election, Kleiminger tried to suggest with posters throughout Rostock that the Greens were in favor of him as a direct candidate and that Green voters should also give Kleiminger the first vote. The Greens were unaware of this campaign in advance and firmly rejected the message of the posters.

After his defeat as a direct candidate in the 2009 federal election, he resigned from his posts on the evening of the election.

In the 2013 federal election, he ran again as a direct candidate in the expanded federal constituency of Rostock - Rostock II district but did not win the seat.

== Social commitment ==
Kleiminger has been chairman of the Rostock district association of Arbeiterwohlfahrt (AWO) since 2002. From 2007 to March 2009, he was a member of the board of the Rostock Tenants' Association in the German Tenants' Association. In addition, he was chairman of the advisory board of Zoologischer Garten Rostock gGmbH from 2000 to the end of September 2007. Since 2007, he has been patron of the action program "School without Racism - School with Courage" (German: Schule ohne Rassismus – Schule mit Courage) at the "Integrated Comprehensive School Friedensreich Hundertwasser" in Rostock-Lichtenhagen. On 31 May 2008 Kleiminger officially took over the patronage of the multi-generation house in Rostock-Toitenwinkel, which is supported by the German Red Cross.

After Kleiminger had already been threatened by right-wing extremist youths on the fringes of an NPD demonstration in Rostock in 2007, which led to a small question in the state parliament of Mecklenburg-Western Pomerania, an attack was made on his Rostock constituency office on the night of 24 June 2008.
