= Maria Hasse =

German mathematician

Maria-Viktoria Hasse (May 30, 1921 – January 10, 2014) was a German mathematician who became the first female professor in the faculty of mathematics and science at TU Dresden. She wrote books on set theory and category theory, and is known as one of the namesakes of the Gallai–Hasse–Roy–Vitaver theorem in graph coloring.

== Education and career ==
Hasse was born in Warnemünde. She went to the Gymnasium in Rostock, and after a term in the Reich Labour Service from 1939 to 1940, studied mathematics, physics, and philosophy at the University of Rostock and University of Tübingen from 1940 to 1943, earning a diploma in 1943 from Rostock. She continued at Rostock as an assistant and lecturer, earning a doctorate (Dr. rer. nat.) in 1949 and a habilitation in 1954. Her doctoral dissertation, Über eine singuläre Intergralgleichung 1. Art mit logarithmischer Unstetigkeit [On a singular integral equation of the 1st kind with logarithmic discontinuity], was supervised by Hans Schubert; her habilitation thesis was Über eine Hillsche Differentialgleichung [On Hill's differential equation]. She worked as a professor of algebra at TU Dresden from 1954 until her 1981 retirement.

== Contributions ==
With Lothar Michler, Hasse wrote Theorie der Kategorien [Category Theory] (Deutscher Verlag, 1966). She also wrote Grundbegriffe der Mengenlehre und Logik [Basic Concepts of Set Theory and Logic] (Harri Deutsch, 1968).

In the theory of graph coloring, the Gallai–Hasse–Roy–Vitaver theorem provides a duality between colorings of the vertices of a graph and orientations of its edges. It states that the minimum number of colors needed in a coloring equals the number of vertices in a longest path, in an orientation chosen to minimize the length of this path. It was stated in 1958 in a graph theory textbook by Claude Berge, and independently published by Hasse, Tibor Gallai, B. Roy, and L. Vitaver. Hasse's publication of this result was the second chronologically, in 1965.
