= Warnemünde =

- District of Rostock
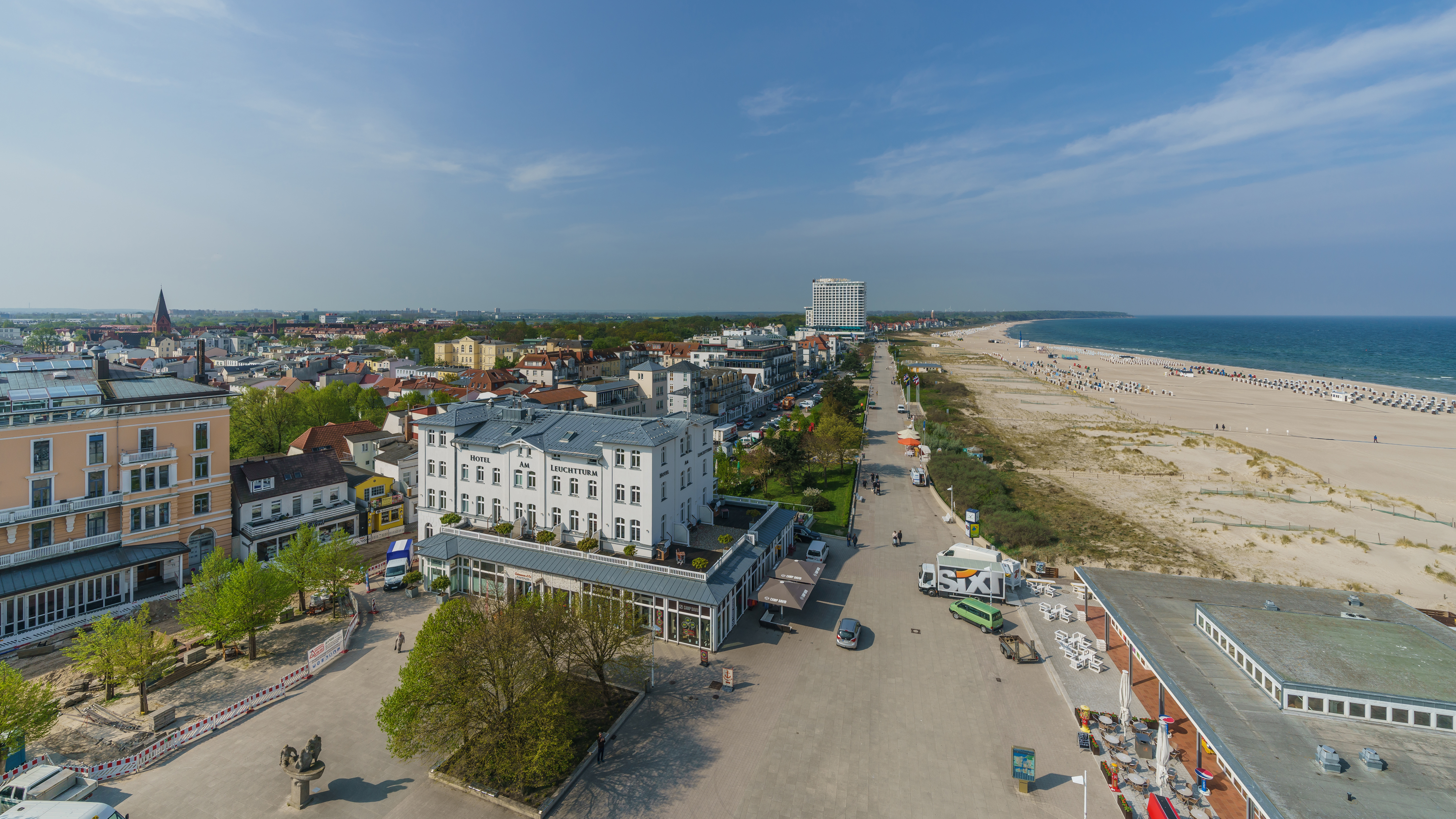
- View of Warnemünde

- Location within Germany
- Coordinates: 54°10′N 12°05′E
- Country: Germany
- Region: Mecklenburg-Vorpommern

Area
  - Total: 5.57 km^{2} (2.15 sq mi)

Population
  - Total: 8,441
- Postal code: 18119
- Area code: 0381
- Website: www.warnemuende.de

Warnemünde (German pronunciation: [vaʁnəˈmʏndə], literally Mouth of the Warnow) is a seaside resort and a district of the city of Rostock in Mecklenburg, Germany. It is located on the Baltic Sea and, as the name implies, at the estuary of the river Warnow. Warnemünde is one of the world's busiest cruise ports.

== History ==
Founded in about 1200, Warnemünde was for centuries a small fishing village with minor importance for the economic and cultural development of the region. In 1323 Warnemünde lost its autonomous status as it was purchased by the city of Rostock in order to safeguard the city's access to the Baltic Sea. It was not until the 19th century that Warnemünde began to develop into an important seaside resort. Today Warnemünde has approximately 8,400 inhabitants.

== Economy ==
Once completely dependent on the fishing industry, Warnemünde's economic alignment has shifted inevitably from the primary to the secondary and tertiary sector. Besides the Nordic Yards Warnemünde ship yard (the former Warnowwerft), the economy largely depends on tourism. The construction of a modern cruise line centre in 2005 has contributed crucially to Warnemünde's establishment as the most important harbour for cruise line ships in Germany.

Warnemünde was formerly the site of the original LFG aircraft factories during World War I. Prior to World War II a number of other companies, mostly related in some way to the now bankrupt LFG, started operations in the area. These included Heinkel and Arado Flugzeugwerke. The factories and surrounding living areas were bombed several times during the war. Many of these factories were used to form Warnow Werft.

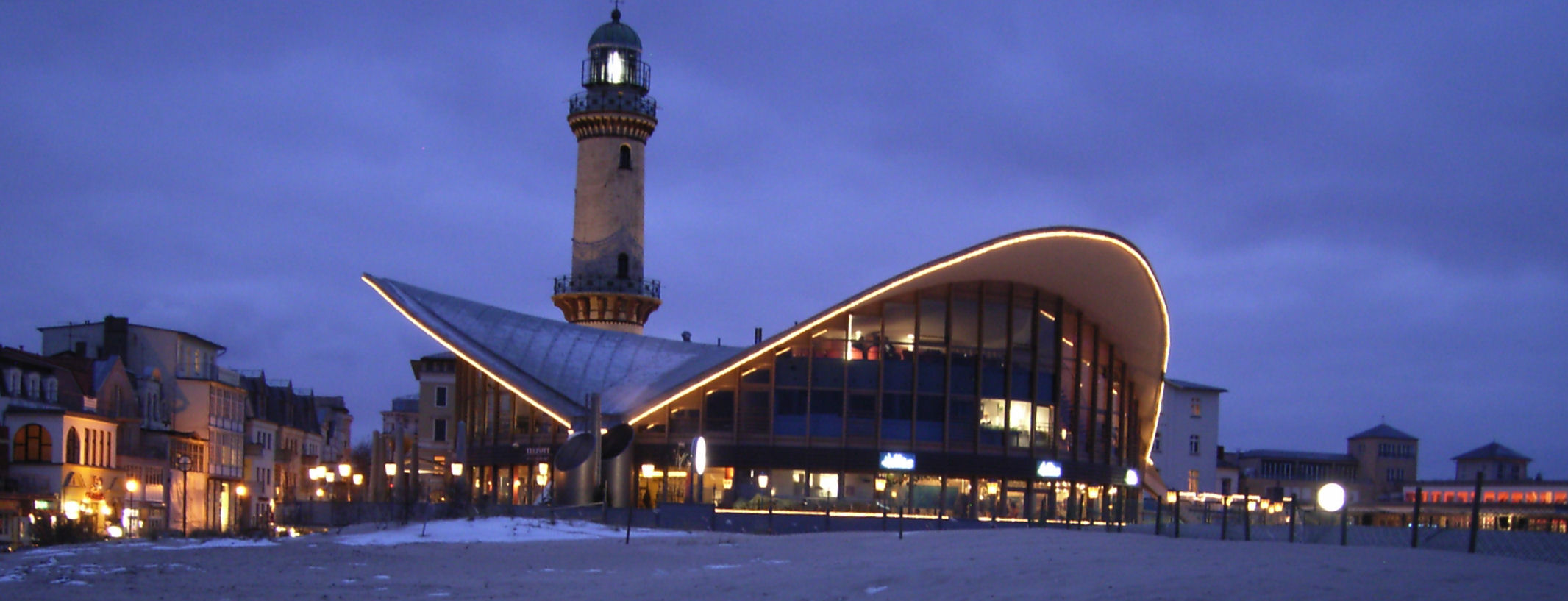
The lighthouse and Teepott

== Sights ==
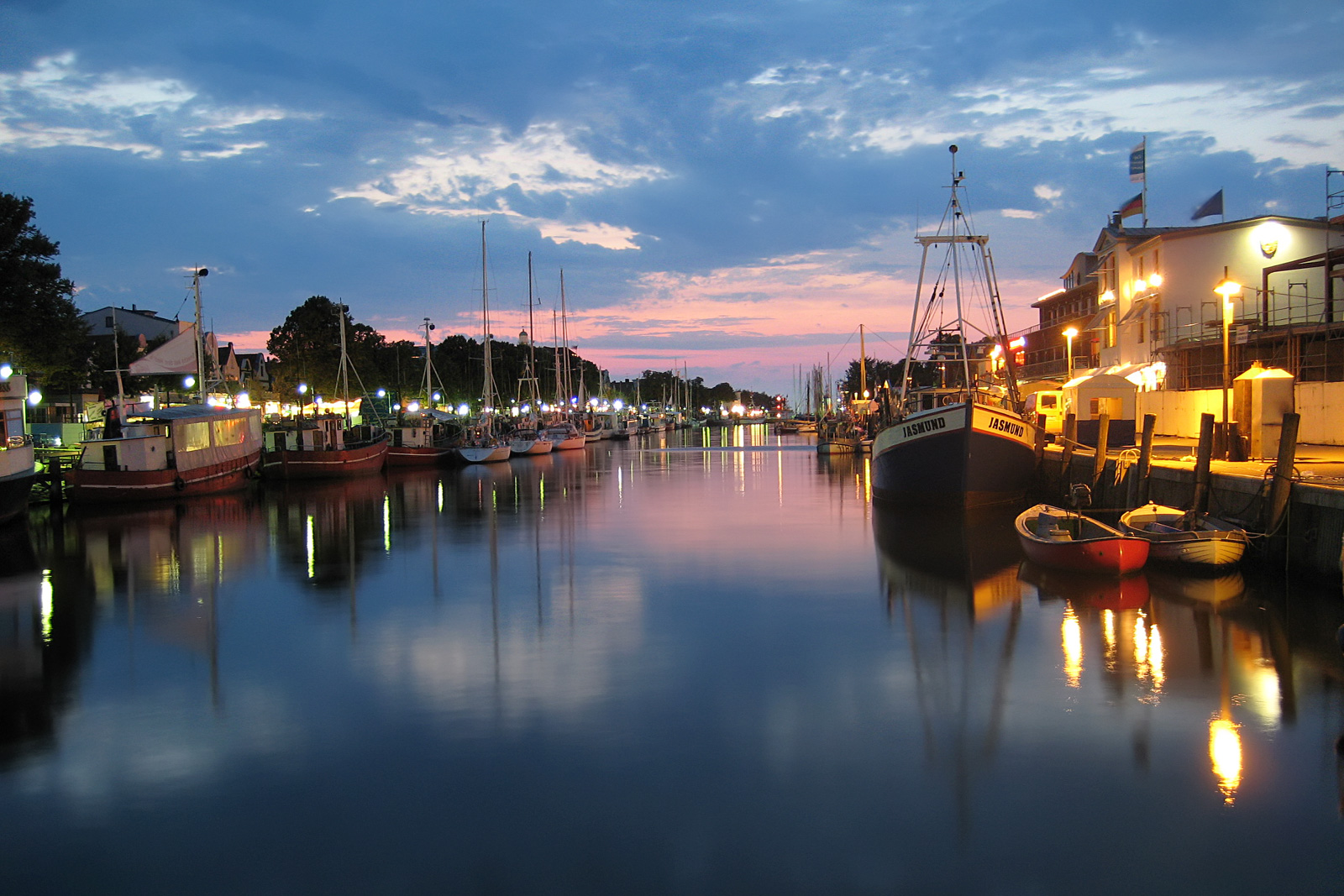
Alter Strom at dusk

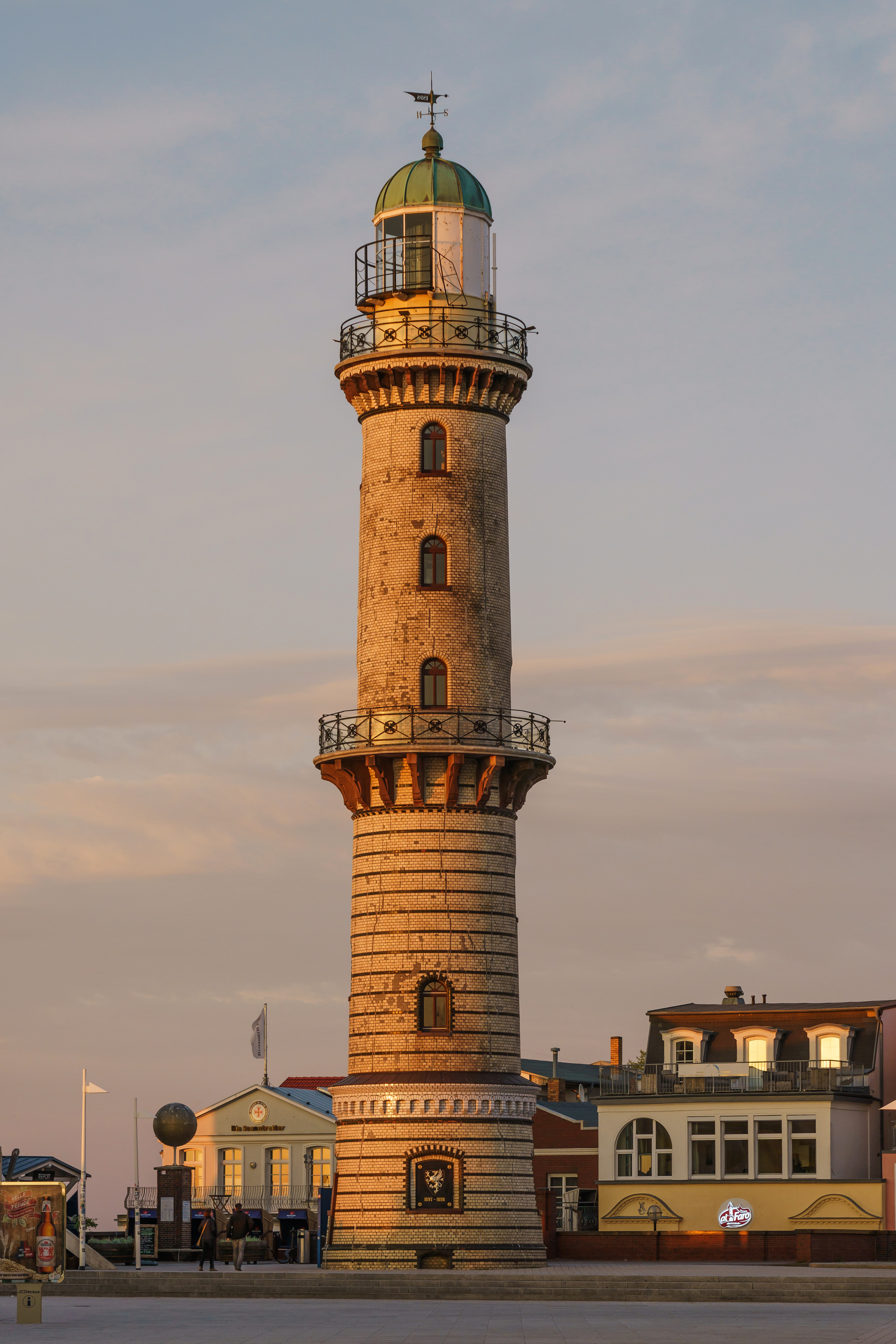
The Lighthouse

Being a centre of maritime traffic, the district of Warnemünde comprises numerous navigational aids, the oldest being the lighthouse, built in 1897, and still currently in use. In the summer, the tower, approximately 37 metres (121 ft) high, allows visitors to enjoy an impressive view over the Baltic Sea and the northern districts of Rostock. Warnemünde's other famous landmark, the nearby Teepott (Teapot in German) with its Hyparschale curved roof, is an interesting living example of East German architecture. Built in Bauhausstile and opened for the first time in 1926, it burned down at the end of World War II. Rebuilt in the 1960s with a curved roof and renovated in 2002, it today houses various restaurants.

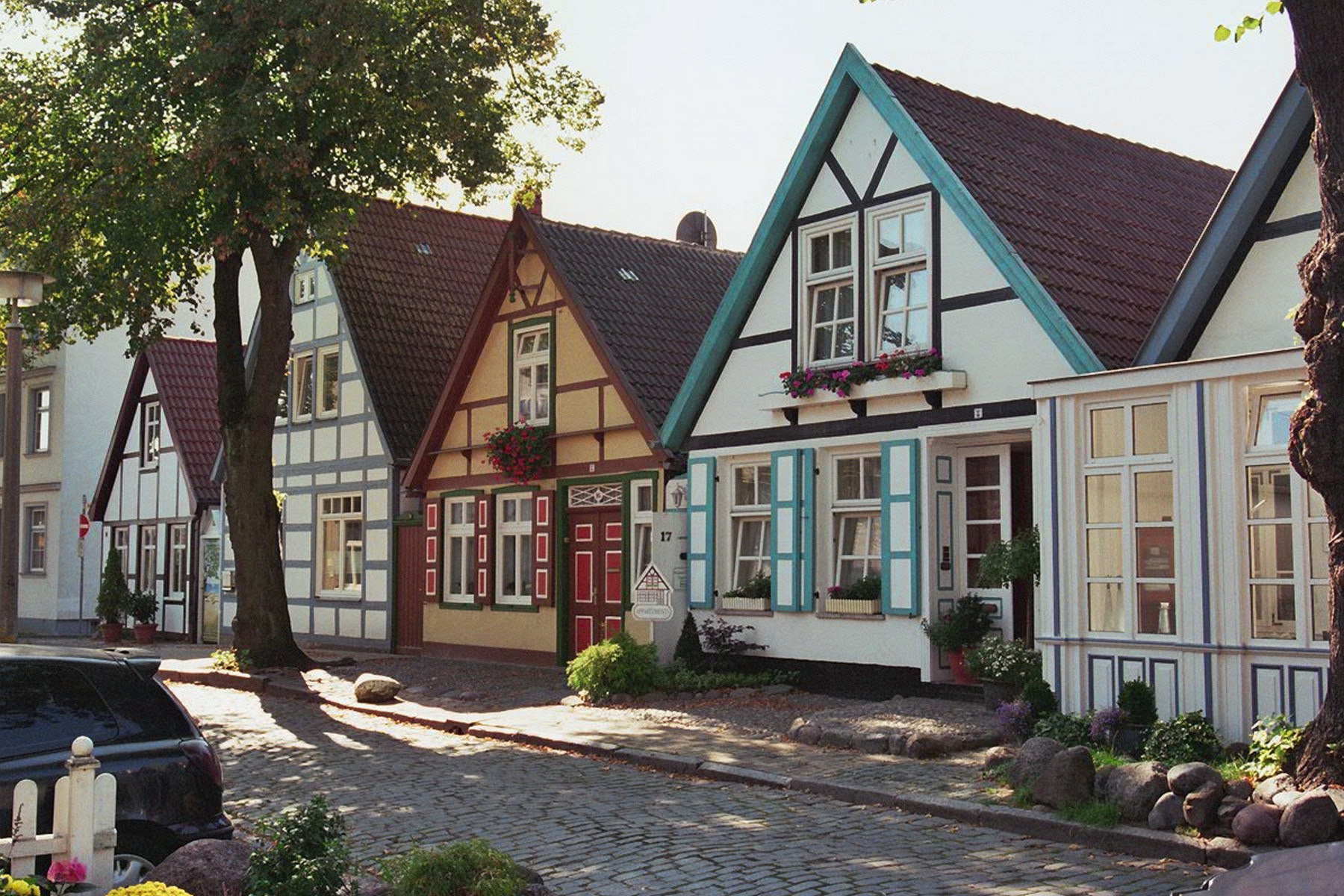
Typical old fishermen houses in the oldtown of Warnemünde

In the vicinity of the canal called der Alte Strom (Old Channel), with its various restaurants, pubs and traditional fishing boats, regional specialities are offered in a fish market. Edvard Munch House, where the Norwegian painter of The Scream lived from 1907 to 1908, is at Am Strom 53. The Warnemünde Church was built on the western edge of the town in 1866 and consecrated in 1871.

Warnemünde's large, sandy beaches are the broadest on the German Baltic Sea coast and stretch out over a length of 3 kilometres (1.9 mi).

There is a simple 1:1 billion scale model of the Solar System, the Warnemünder Planetenwanderweg, with a 1.4m diameter sphere as a model of the Sun installed near the light house, and signs with true scale depictions of the planets at the appropriate distances of their orbits along a coastal walking trail westwards. Some of these signs are over a kilometre apart, and the total length of the Planetenwanderweg is close to 6 km (5,870m). The model includes Pluto and has not been updated since Pluto was reclassified as a dwarf planet. Walking along the Planetenwanderweg allows hikers to get an intuitive idea of the relative distances between the orbits of the planets and the Sun.

== Climate ==
The district of Warnemünde has a Baltic-influenced oceanic climate (Cfb) according to the Köppen climate classification system.

Climate data for Rostock (Warnemünde), 1991–2020 normals)
Month	Jan	Feb	Mar	Apr	May	Jun	Jul	Aug	Sep	Oct	Nov	Dec	Year
Record high °C (°F)	14.0 (57.2)	17.0 (62.6)	22.3 (72.1)	29.5 (85.1)	32.8 (91.0)	35.0 (95.0)	35.5 (95.9)	36.9 (98.4)	32.4 (90.3)	26.1 (79.0)	19.5 (67.1)	15.5 (59.9)	36.9 (98.4)
Mean maximum °C (°F)	10.1 (50.2)	10.9 (51.6)	15.7 (60.3)	22.0 (71.6)	26.2 (79.2)	28.9 (84.0)	30.3 (86.5)	30.6 (87.1)	25.4 (77.7)	19.8 (67.6)	14.5 (58.1)	10.7 (51.3)	32.5 (90.5)
Mean daily maximum °C (°F)	3.8 (38.8)	4.4 (39.9)	7.3 (45.1)	12.2 (54.0)	16.4 (61.5)	19.7 (67.5)	22.0 (71.6)	22.2 (72.0)	18.5 (65.3)	13.3 (55.9)	8.0 (46.4)	4.9 (40.8)	12.7 (54.9)
Daily mean °C (°F)	1.9 (35.4)	2.2 (36.0)	4.4 (39.9)	8.4 (47.1)	12.5 (54.5)	16.0 (60.8)	18.4 (65.1)	18.4 (65.1)	15.0 (59.0)	10.5 (50.9)	6.0 (42.8)	3.0 (37.4)	9.7 (49.5)
Mean daily minimum °C (°F)	−0.2 (31.6)	0.1 (32.2)	1.8 (35.2)	5.2 (41.4)	9.0 (48.2)	12.6 (54.7)	15.0 (59.0)	15.0 (59.0)	12.0 (53.6)	7.9 (46.2)	4.0 (39.2)	1.1 (34.0)	6.9 (44.4)
Mean minimum °C (°F)	−7.7 (18.1)	−6.0 (21.2)	−2.9 (26.8)	0.4 (32.7)	4.3 (39.7)	8.7 (47.7)	11.2 (52.2)	11.1 (52.0)	7.7 (45.9)	2.5 (36.5)	−1.6 (29.1)	−5.8 (21.6)	−9.8 (14.4)
Record low °C (°F)	−17.8 (0.0)	−18.4 (−1.1)	−15.1 (4.8)	−4.0 (24.8)	0.0 (32.0)	2.5 (36.5)	7.3 (45.1)	6.5 (43.7)	3.4 (38.1)	−1.8 (28.8)	−9.3 (15.3)	−15.6 (3.9)	−18.4 (−1.1)
Average precipitation mm (inches)	46.2 (1.82)	38.2 (1.50)	39.2 (1.54)	34.2 (1.35)	49.7 (1.96)	67.8 (2.67)	69.8 (2.75)	68.5 (2.70)	56.1 (2.21)	48.1 (1.89)	45.7 (1.80)	50.9 (2.00)	614.3 (24.19)
Average precipitation days (≥ 0.1 mm)	16.6	14.8	13.5	11.3	12.5	13.5	14.0	14.8	13.4	15.1	15.9	17.4	171.9
Average snowy days (≥ 1.0 cm)	5.9	6.0	3.4	0.1	0	0	0	0	0	0	0.8	3.2	19.4
Average relative humidity (%)	84.5	82.1	79.1	74.4	74.4	74.2	74.7	74.8	77.4	80.7	84.5	85.5	78.9
Mean monthly sunshine hours	49.2	67.7	133.3	207.8	260.3	250.4	252.1	224.8	168.7	109.1	53.6	37.1	1,813.9
Source 1: World Meteorological Organization
Source 2: Météo Climat Infoclimat

== Culture and sport ==
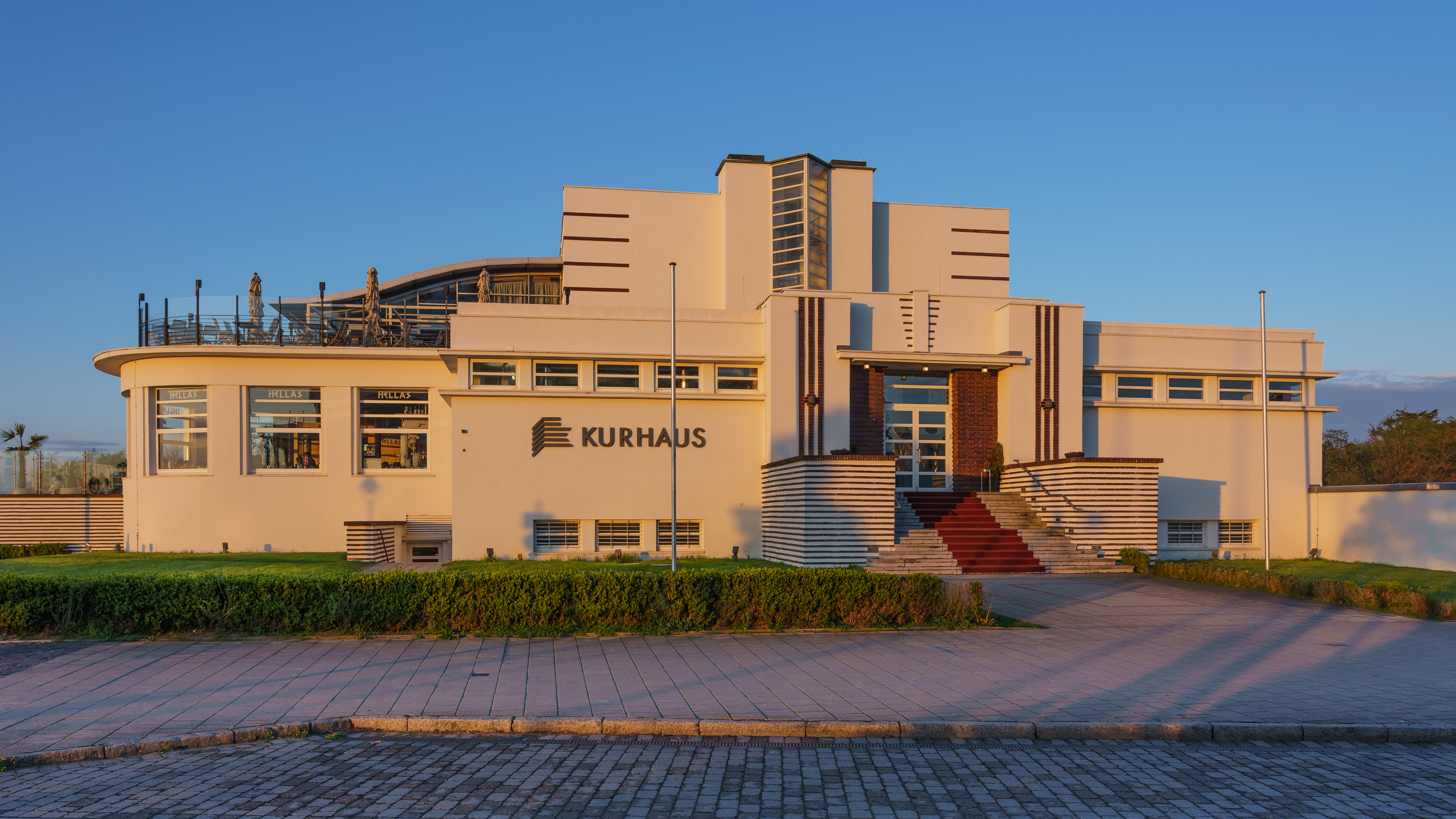
"Kurhaus" (Spa House)

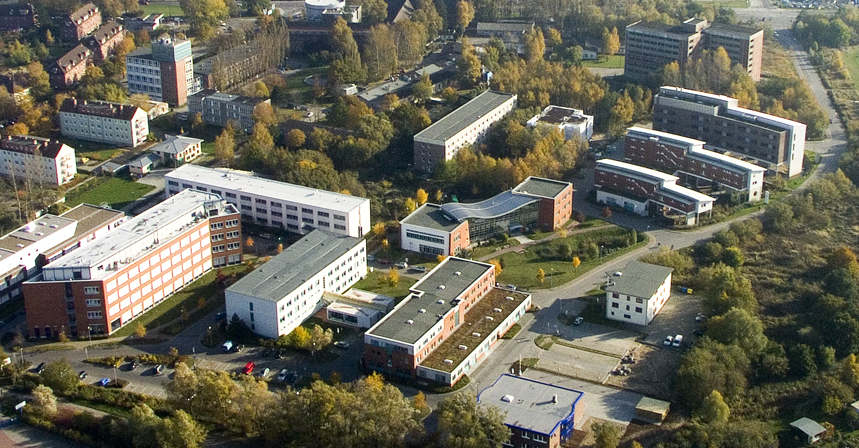
Technology Campus Warnemünde

There are a lot of musicians and bands in Warnemünde who are involved in cultural events.

- De Klaashahns
- De Plattfööt
- TonArt
- Irish Coffee
- Heide Mundo

=== Sport ===
Because of the weak current and good sailing conditions, Warnemünde is a major sailing area in Germany. The beach is especially good for kitesurfing, windsurfing, underwater diving, swimming and Nordic walking. In the summertime there are many international competitions like the yearly sailing event Warnemünde Week in July. Many people flock to Warnemunde to witness these competitions.

== Personalities ==
- Stephan Jantzen (1827–1913), seaman, commander of the Pilots and Rescue Team
- Ernst Heinkel (1888–1958) he established the Heinkel-Flugzeugwerke company at Warnemünde in 1922, a prominent Nazi.
- Karl Heinz Robrahn (1913–1987), lyricist
- Maria Hasse (1921 in Warnemünde – 2014), a German mathematician who became the first female professor in the faculty of mathematics and science at TU Dresden .
- Klaus Lass (born 1950), singer and songwriter, city-guide
- Matthias Hahn (born 1965), former handball player and currently coach.
- Kirsten Emmelmann (born 1961), former world champion sprinter
