= Steffen Bockhahn =

German politician

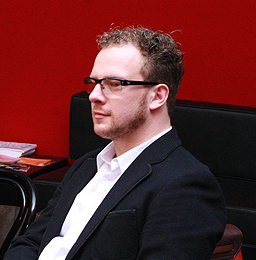
- Bockhahn in 2011

Member of the Bundestag; for Rostock
- In office 27 October 2009 – 22 October 2013
- Preceded by: Christian Kleiminger
- Succeeded by: Peter Stein

Personal details
- Born: 29 December 1978 (age 47) Rostock, East Germany
- Party: Die Linke (2007–2023)
- Other political affiliations: PDS (1995–2007)
- Children: 1
- Education: University of Rostock
- Website: www.bockhahn.de

Steffen Bockhahn (29 December 1978) is a German politician. He is the Senator for Social Affairs, Youth, Health and Schools of the Hanseatic City of Rostock. From 24 October 2009 to 5 November 2012 he was the state chairman of the Left Party in Mecklenburg-Western Pomerania, and from 2009 to 2013 he was a member of the 17th German Bundestag, where he was elected as a direct candidate.

== Early life and education ==
Bockhahn was born in Rostock spent his childhood in Rostock. Until he started school, he lived with his parents and older sister in the Reutershagen district before the family moved to a new development in the city center. From 1985 to 1991, he attended the 9th POS Clara Zetkin, which regained its old name "Große Stadtschule" during the reunification period. From the third grade on, he learned the Russian language there. From 1991 until his Abitur, Bockhahn was a student at the Gymnasium am Goetheplatz. He passed his Abitur in 1997 with advanced courses in mathematics and English.

Bockhahn did his civilian alternative service (German: Zivildienst) at a daycare center run by the People's Solidarity in Rostock. From 1999 to 2000, he was a volunteer at the private radio station Ostseewelle before moving to its competitor Antenne Mecklenburg-Vorpommern. There he worked as an editor and news anchor.

In 2002, Bockhahn began studying political science and modern European history at the University of Rostock. He passed his Bachelor of Arts exams in 2005 and his Master of Arts exams in 2007. From October 2007, he was an assistant to Dietmar Bartsch, a member of the German Bundestag.

Bockhahn has been married since 2005 and has been the father of a child since 2009.

== Political career ==
Bockhahn began his political involvement as a school representative at the high school and in the district student council of Rostock. On 1 May 1995 he joined the PDS at the age of 16. Before he withdrew from active politics from 1999 onwards, due to work commitments, he was a member of the district executive committee, the state executive committee and a delegate to the federal party conference.

In 2004, Bockhahn ran for the Rostock city council for the first time and was elected. In the same year, he became deputy state chairman of his party in Mecklenburg-Western Pomerania. In the 2005 federal election, Bockhahn stood for the PDS in constituency 14. After Christian Kleiminger (SPD) and Eckhardt Rehberg (CDU), he received the third-best vote but failed to win. In the 2009 federal election, he was elected as a direct candidate. In the 2013 federal election, he lost the direct mandate in the Bundestag constituency Rostock – Landkreis Rostock II (constituency 14) to Peter Stein (CDU).

Since 2007, Bockhahn was chairman of the parliamentary group The Left in Rostock. During this time, he initiated a citizens' petition against the sale of municipal property together with the service sector union ver.di. More than 10,000 signatures were collected in five weeks. However, due to an objection by the mayor, there are now court proceedings to clarify the legality.

On 5 March 2014, Bockhahn was elected senator for the department of youth, social affairs, health, schools, and sports by the Rostock city parliament.

In a decision dated 10 July 2014 the Schwerin Administrative Court prohibited the Hanseatic City of Rostock from appointing Bockhahn as a senator (elective official) because he lacked the aptitude, qualification, and expertise required for the office and the election by the Bürgerschaft violated the constitutional requirement to select the best (Case No. 1 B 599/14). Citizens of the Hanseatic city of Rostock appealed against the recommendation of its city administration to the Higher Administrative Court of Greifswald, which lifted the ban on appeal in the last instance on 9 January 2015. Bockhahn was a candidate for the mayoral election in Rostock in 2019. He achieved 18.9% in the first round and thus entered the runoff against Claus Ruhe Madsen, but lost the same on 16 June 2019, with 42.9%.

== Observation by the Federal Office for the Protection of the Constitution ==
In January 2012, it became known that Bockhahn was one of 27 members of the Bundestag of the Left Party under observation by the Federal Office for the Protection of the Constitution, which was criticized by politicians of all factions. The observation of Bockhahn was seen as particularly sensitive because the Scientific Services of the Bundestag had stated in December 2011 that "due to the special task of the Confidence Committee [...] only very exceptional circumstances justify the observation of a member [...]."

In July 2014, it became known that his cell phone had been tapped by U.S. intelligence agencies. Bockhahn's closest aide noticed tampering with her cell phone on 30 July 2013. Unknown persons are said to have searched through the entire SMS traffic between her and the then member of the Bundestag, as well as specifically looking for service emails related to the Parliamentary Oversight Panel, of which Bockhahn was a member.
