= Harald Terpe =

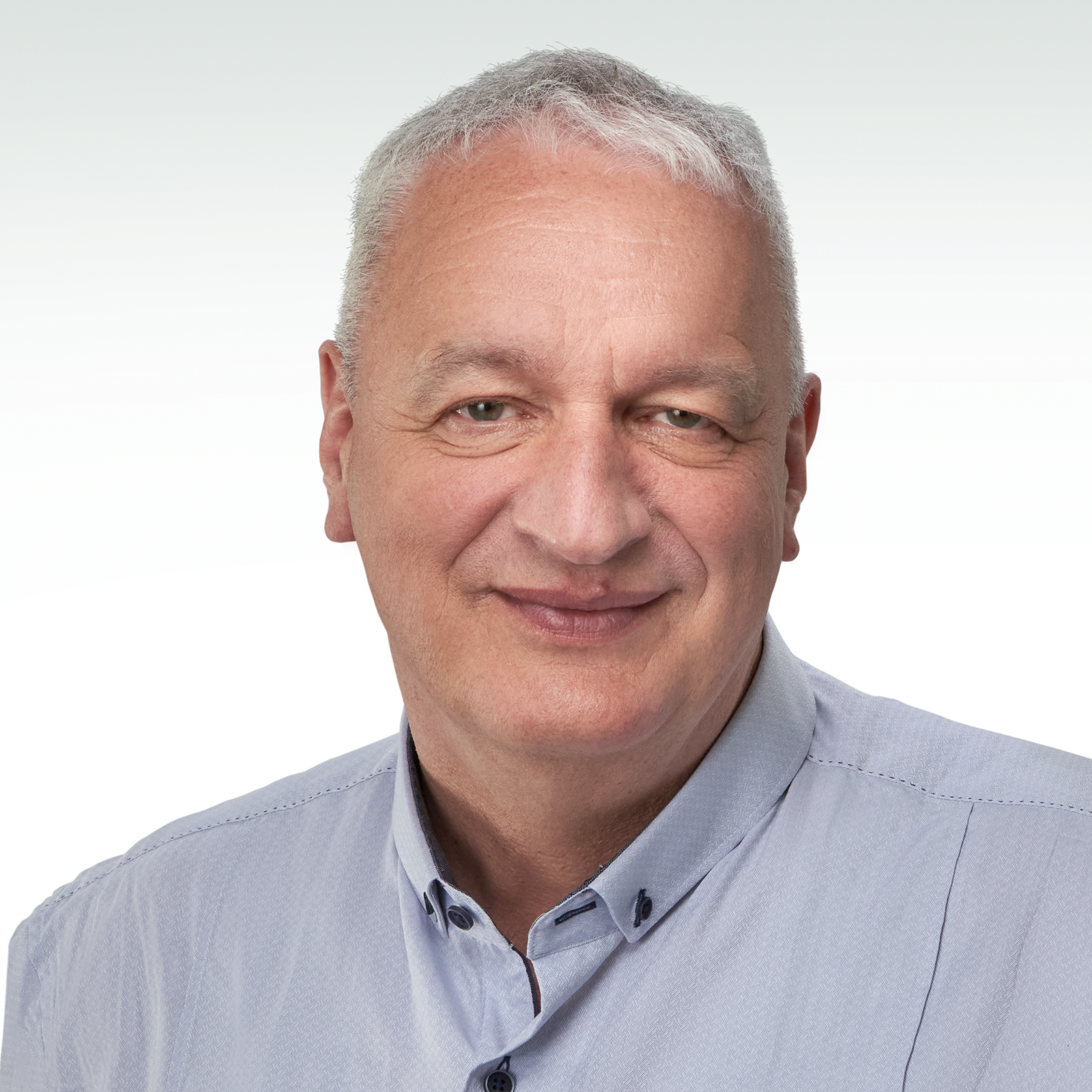
Herpe in 2021

Harald Terpe is a German politician of the Alliance 90/The Greens. After 12 years in the Bundestag, he is currently working in the Landtag of Mecklenburg-Vorpommern.

== Biography ==
=== Early life and education ===
Terpe was born on 17 July 1954 in Greifswald, Mecklenburg-Vorpommern, then East Germany. After attending school from 1961 to 1973, he passed his Abitur and served in the Bundeswehr until 1976. He then studied medicine in Rostock from 1976 to 1982, graduating with a degree in medicine and getting a Staatsexamen. From 1982 to 1987, Terpe did a specialist training in pathology at the Institute of Pathology at the University of Rostock, where he got his doctorate. From 1998 on, he worked there as a senior physician. He is a member of the German Red Cross and the Medical Association of Mecklenburg-Vorpommern. In the 1990's he was a member of the latter's executive board.

=== Political Work ===
Terpe joined the New Forum, a pro-democracy political movement of East Germany, in 1989 during the months leading to the Fall of the inner German border. During that time, big parts of the New Forum joined the Alliance 90, which itself then became today's Green Party, the Alliance 90/The Greens, in 1993.

Terpe was a member of the Rostock City Council from 1999 to 2015 and was re-elected in 2019. As he was given a seat in the Landtag of Mecklenburg-Vorpommern in the 2021 elections, he handed over his council seat to Johann-Georg Jaeger in order to avoid a double mandate, as he had during his time in the Bundestag. The next election in Mecklenburg-Vorpommern is presumably in 2026. In the Ladtag he "stand[s] for a holistic political approach. To this end, [He] bring[s] a broad range of expertise and political experience from [his] twelve years as a member of the Bundestag, health politician, development politician and bioethicist."

He was a member of the Bundestag from 2005 to 2017, by winning a seat in the 16th, 17th and 18th election through the state list (e. g. not by winning a constituency).

=== Private Life ===
Terpe is married and has six children. He is non-denominational.
