= Votive ship =

Model of a ship in a church building

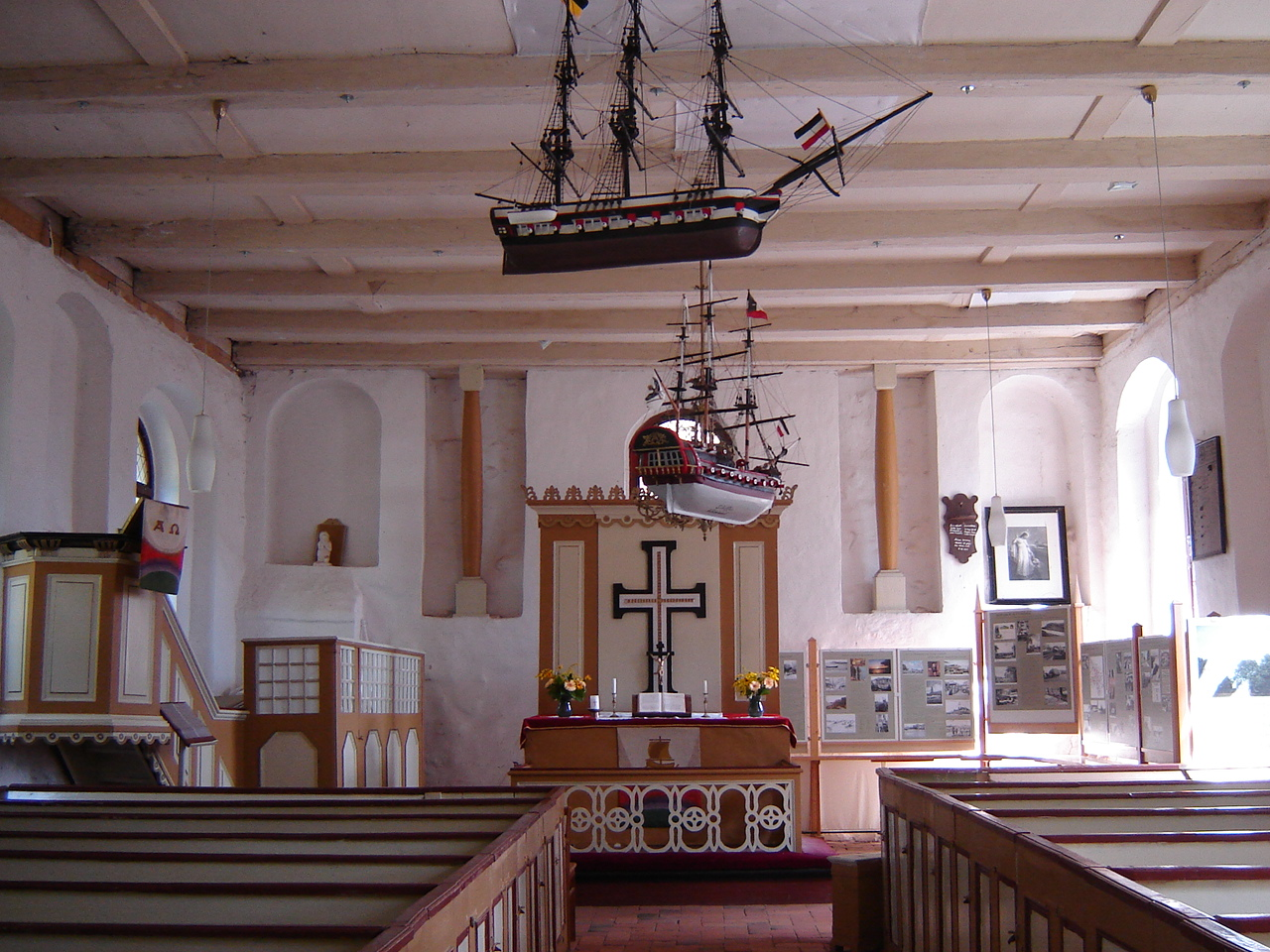
Votive ships under the ceiling to the historic Evangelical Church in Garz

A votive ship, sometimes called a church ship, is a ship model displayed in a church. As a rule, votive ships are constructed and given as gifts to the church by seamen and ship builders. Votive ships are relatively common in churches in the Nordic countries Denmark, Sweden, Norway and Finland, as well as on Åland and Faroe Islands, but are known also to exist in Germany, the United Kingdom and Spain.

Votive ships are quite common in France, in coastal towns (and in some inland ones as well) either as model ships (generally made by sailors after escaping a shipwreck ) or as paintings (generally depicting some awkward situation) they are known under the Latin term of ex-voto, in fullfillment of a vow. The church of Sainte Anne d'Auray in Brittany has the biggest French collection of marine ex-votos, but the practice even extends to the Mediterranean French shores, including Corsica.

The practice of displaying model ships in churches stems from the Middle Ages and appears to have been known throughout Christian Europe, in both Catholic and Lutheran countries. The oldest known remaining votive ship is a Spanish ship model from the 15th century. A model ship originally displayed in Stockholm Cathedral but today in the Stockholm Maritime Museum dating from circa 1590 is the oldest surviving example in the Nordic countries.
