= Steffi Burmeister =

German politician (born 1978)

Member of the Landtag of Mecklenburg-Vorpommern
- Assuming office 20 October 2026
- Succeeding: Nils Saemann
- Constituency: Landkreis Rostock III

Personal details
- Born: 1978 (age 47–48)
- Party: Alternative for Germany (since 2019)

Steffi Burmeister (born 1978) is a German politician who was elected member of the Landtag of Mecklenburg-Vorpommern in 2026. She has served as chairwoman of the Alternative for Germany in Rostock since 2022.
