= Transportation network =

Transportation network may refer to:

- Transport network, physical infrastructure
- Transportation network (graph theory), the mathematical graph theory
- Transportation network company, a legal term for a ridesharing company in certain jurisdictions
