= Approximate max-flow min-cut theorem =

Mathematical propositions in network flow theory

In graph theory, approximate max-flow min-cut theorems concern the relationship between the maximum flow rate (max-flow) and the minimum cut (min-cut) in multi-commodity flow problems. The classic max-flow min-cut theorem states that for networks with a single type of flow (single-commodity flows), the maximum possible flow from source to sink is precisely equal to the capacity of the smallest cut. However, this equality doesn't generally hold when multiple types of flow exist in the network (multi-commodity flows). In these more complex scenarios, the maximum flow and the minimum cut are not necessarily equal. Instead, approximate max-flow min-cut theorems provide bounds on how close the maximum flow can get to the minimum cut, with the max-flow always being lower or equal to the min-cut.

For example, imagine two factories (the sources) producing different goods (the commodities) that need to be shipped to two warehouses (the sinks). Each road has a capacity limit for all goods combined. The min-cut is the smallest total road capacity that, if closed, would prevent goods from both factories from reaching their respective warehouses. The max-flow is the maximum total amount of goods that can be shipped. Because both types of goods compete for the same roads, the max-flow may be lower than the min-cut. The approximate max-flow min-cut theorem tells us how close the maximum amount of shipped goods can get to that minimum road capacity.

The theorems have enabled the development of approximation algorithms for use in graph partition and related problems, where finding the absolute best solution is computationally prohibitive.

== Multicommodity flow problem ==
A "commodity" in a network flow problem is a pair of source and sink nodes. In a multi-commodity flow problem, there are k≥1 commodities, each with its own source $s_{i}$, sink $t_{i}$, and demand $D_{i}$. The objective is to simultaneously route $D_{\text{i}}$ units of commodity i from $s_{i}$ to $t_{i}$ for each i, such that the total amount of all commodities passing through any edge is no greater than its capacity. (In the case of undirected edges, the sum of the flows in both directions cannot exceed the capacity of the edge). Specially, a 1-commodity (or single commodity) flow problem is also known as a maximum flow problem. According to the Ford–Fulkerson algorithm, the max-flow and min-cut are always equal in a 1-commodity flow problem.

=== Max-flow and min-cut ===
In a multicommodity flow problem, max-flow is the maximum value of f, where f is the common fraction of each commodity that is routed, such that $fD_{\text{i}}$ units of commodity i can be simultaneously routed for each i without violating any capacity constraints. min-cut is the minimum of all cuts of the ratio $\varphi$ of the capacity of the cut to the demand of the cut. Max-flow is always upper bounded by the min-cut for a multicommodity flow problem.

=== Uniform multicommodity flow problem ===
In a uniform multicommodity flow problem, there is a commodity for every pair of nodes and the demand for every commodity is the same. (Without loss of generality, the demand for every commodity is set to one.) The underlying network and capacities are arbitrary.

=== Product multicommodity flow problem ===
In a product multicommodity flow problem, there is a nonnegative weight for each node $v \in V$ in graph $G=(V,E)$. The demand for the commodity between nodes u and v is the product of the weights of node u and node v. The uniform multicommodity flow problem is a special case of the product multicommodity flow problem for which the weight is set to 1 for all nodes $u \in V$.

=== Duality of linear programming ===
In general, the dual of a multicommodity flow problem for a graph G is the problem of apportioning a fixed amount of weight (where weights can be considered as distances) to the edges of G such that to maximize the cumulative distance between the source and sink pairs.

=== History ===
The research on the relationship between the max-flow and min-cut of multicommodity flow problem has obtained great interest since Ford and Fulkerson's result for 1-commodity flow problems. Hu showed that the max-flow and min-cut are always equal for two commodities. Okamura and Seymour illustrated a 4-commodity flow problem with max-flow equals to 3/4 and min-cut equals 1. Shahrokhi and Matula also proved that the max-flow and min-cut are equal provided the dual of the flow problem satisfies a certain cut condition in a uniform multicommodity flow problem. Many other researchers also showed concrete research results in similar problems

For a general network flow problem, the max-flow is within a factor of k of the min-cut since each commodity can be optimized separately using $1/k$ of the capacity of each edge. This is not a good result especially in case of large numbers of commodities.

== Approximate max-flow min-cut theorems ==
=== Theorems of uniform multicommodity flow problems ===
There are two theorems first introduced by Tom Leighton and Satish Rao in 1988 and then extended in 1999. Theorem 2 gives a tighter bound compared to Theorem 1.

Theorem 1. For any n, there is an n-node uniform multicommodity flow problem with max-flow f and min-cut $\varphi$ for which $f\le O\left(\frac{\varphi}{\log n}\right)$.

Theorem 2. For any uniform multicommodity flow problem, $\Omega\left(\frac{\varphi}{\log n}\right)\le f\le\varphi$, where f is the max-flow and $\varphi$ is the min-cut of the uniform multicommodity flow problem.

To prove Theorem 2, both the max-flow and the min-cut should be discussed. For the max-flow, the techniques from duality theory of linear programming have to be employed. According to the duality theory of linear programming, an optimal distance function results in a total weight that is equal to the max-flow of the uniform multicommodity flow problem. For the min-cut, a 3-stage process has to be followed:

Stage 1: Consider the dual of uniform commodity flow problem and use the optimal solution to define a graph with distance labels on the edges.

Stage 2: Starting from a source or a sink, grow a region in the graph until find a cut of small enough capacity separating the root from its mate.

Stage 3: Remove the region and repeat the process of stage 2 until all nodes get processed.

=== Generalized to product multicommodity flow problem ===
Theorem 3. For any product multicommodity flow problem with k commodities, $\Omega\left(\frac{\varphi}{\log k}\right)\le f\le \varphi$, where f is the max-flow and $\varphi$ is the min-cut of the product multicommodity flow problem.

The proof methodology is similar to that for Theorem 2; the major difference is to take node weights into consideration.

=== Extended to directed multicommodity flow problem ===
In a directed multicommodity flow problem, each edge has a direction, and the flow is restricted to move in the specified direction. In a directed uniform multicommodity flow problem, the demand is set to 1 for every directed edge.

Theorem 4. For any directed uniform multicommodity flow problem with n nodes, $\Omega\left(\frac{\varphi}{\log n}\right)\le f\le \varphi$, where f is the max-flow and $\varphi$ is the min-cut of the uniform multicommodity flow problem.

The major difference in the proof methodology compared to Theorem 2 is that, now the edge directions need to be considered when defining distance labels in stage 1 and for growing the regions in stage 2, more details can be found in.

Similarly, for product multicommodity flow problem, we have the following extended theorem:

Theorem 5. For any directed product multicommodity flow problem with k commodities, $\Omega\left(\frac{\varphi}{\log k}\right)\le f\le\varphi$, where f is the max-flow and $\varphi$ is the directed min-cut of the product multicommodity flow problem.

== Applications to approximation algorithms ==
The above theorems are very useful to design approximation algorithms for NP-hard problems, such as the graph partition problem and its variations. Here below we briefly introduce a few examples, and the in-depth elaborations can be found in Leighton and Rao (1999).

=== Sparsest cuts ===
A sparsest cut of a graph $G=(V,E)$ is a partition for which the ratio of the number of edges connecting the two partitioned components over the product of the numbers of nodes of both components is minimized. This is a NP-hard problem, and it can be approximated to within $O(\log n)$ factor using Theorem 2. Also, a sparsest cut problem with weighted edges, weighted nodes or directed edges can be approximated within an $O(\log p)$ factor where p is the number of nodes with nonzero weight according to Theorem 3, 4 and 5.

=== Balanced cuts and separators ===
In some applications, we want to find a small cut in a graph $G=(V,E)$ that partitions the graph into nearly equal-size pieces. We usually call a cut b-balanced or a (b,1 − b)-separator (for b ≤ 1/2) if $b\pi(V)\le\pi(U)\le(1-b)\pi(V)$ where $\pi(U)$ is the sum of the node weights in U. This is also an NP-hard problem. An approximation algorithm has been designed for this problem, and the core idea is that G has a b-balanced cut of size S, then we find a b′-balanced cut of size $O\left(S\log \frac n b -b'\right)$ for any b' where b′ < b and b′ ≤ 1/3. Then we repeat the process then finally obtain the result that total weight of the edges in the cut is at most $O\left(\frac{S\log n}{b-b'}\right)$.

=== VLSI layout problems ===
It is helpful to find a layout of minimum size when designing a VLSI circuit. Such a problem can often be modeled as a graph embedding problem. The objective is to find an embedding for which the layout area is minimized. Finding the minimum layout area is also NP-hard. An approximation algorithm has been introduced and the result is $O(\log^6 n)$ times optimal.

=== Forwarding index problem ===
Given an n-node graph G and an embedding of $K_n$ in G, Chung et al. defined the forwarding index of the embedding to be the maximum number of paths (each corresponding to an edge of $K_n$) that pass through any node of G. The objective is to find an embedding that minimizes the forwarding index. Using embedding approaches it is possible to bound the node and edge-forwarding indices to within an $O(\log n)$-factor for every graph G.

=== Planar edge deletion ===
Tragoudas uses the approximation algorithm for balanced separators to find a set of $O\left((R\log n + \sqrt{nR})\log\frac{n}{R}\right)$ edges whose removal from a bounded-degree graph G results in a planar graph, where R is the minimum number of edges that need to be removed from G before it becomes planar. It remains an open question if there is a polylog n times optimal approximation algorithm for R.
