= L. R. Ford Jr. =

American mathematician (1927–2017)

Lester “Les” Randolph Ford, Jr.
- Born: September 23, 1927; Houston, Texas, USA
- Died: February 26, 2017 (aged 89)
- Education: University of Chicago; University of Illinois at Urbana-Champaign

Lester Randolph Ford Jr. (September 23, 1927 – February 26, 2017) was an American mathematician specializing in network flow problems. He was the son of mathematician Lester R. Ford Sr.

Ford's paper with D. R. Fulkerson on the maximum flow problem and the Ford–Fulkerson algorithm for solving it, published as a technical report in 1954 and in a journal in 1956, established the max-flow min-cut theorem. In 1962 they published Flows in Networks with Princeton University Press. According to the preface, it "included topics that were purely mathematically motivated, together with those that are strictly utilitarian in concept." In his review, S.W. Golomb wrote, "This book is an attractive, well-written account of a fairly new topic in pure and applied combinatorial analysis." As a topic of continued interest, a new edition was published in 2010 with a new foreword by Robert G. Bland and James B. Orlin.

In 1956, Ford developed the Bellman–Ford algorithm for finding shortest paths in graphs that have negative weights, two years before Richard Bellman also published the algorithm.

With Selmer M. Johnson, he developed the Ford–Johnson algorithm for sorting, which is of theoretical interest in connection with the problem of doing comparison sort with the fewest comparisons. For 20 years, this algorithm required the minimum number of comparisons.

In 1963 along with his father Lester R. Ford, he published an innovative textbook on calculus. For a given function f and point x, they defined a frame as a rectangle containing (x, f(x)) with sides parallel to the axes of the plane (page 9). Frames are then exploited to define continuous functions (page 10) and to describe integrable functions (page 148).

== Personal information ==
Lester was born in Houston, Texas on September 23, 1927. He learned to play piano and the flute as a young man, continuing to play piano as he got older. He was also a whistler, frequently heard whistling while he worked on math or for fun.. For higher education he considered Harvard and Oberlin Conservatory, but chose the University of Chicago which provided him a scholarship. He earned his bachelor's degree in 1949 and a masters in 1950. Ford continued his studies at University of Illinois at Urbana-Champaign where he earned a Ph.D. in mathematics in 1953.

Ford's employers included the U. S. Army, University of North Carolina and RAND Corporation. The Defense Research Corporation of Goleta, California employed him for forty years as he kept pace with digital revolution. Ford married twice. With his first wife, Janet Johnson, he had nine children, including Fred Ford, programmer of the Star Control Universe. His second wife was Naoma Gower.
