= Active flow network =

Graph with actively propelled particles

An active flow network is a graph with edges and nodes, where particles inside this graph are propelled by an active mechanism. This type of network is used to study the motion of molecules in biological medium. Examples are organelles, including the Endoplasmic Reticulum (ER). The mechanism of the flow between nodes is actively driven, as opposed to passive transport by diffusion. Active transport requires energy consumption, found in the form of ATP in biological systems. The slime mold Physarum polycephalum is also growing as a network, where motion inside is driven an active flow.

== In transportation ==
Unidirectional transportation is reminiscent of trains, cars or communication (internet, telephone), where there is a limiting capacity due to maximal amount of commodities that can travel inside a branch connecting two nodes.

== In the body ==
Arteries and vein generate a network where the blood flow is pulsed by the heart contraction cycle. The flow is often model using complex fluid mechanics (Navier-stokes equations) that could be coupled to the structure. Red blood cells are also transported inside these networks and high pressure resistance could be due in part to red blood cell trafficking jam but also to capillary (largest pressure drops occur in the smallest vessels), especially in the brain. Blood flow is an active process further modulated by neuronal activity.

== In electronics ==
In electronics, diodes or resistances form network consuming electrical energy. Theory based on mathematical graph theory and physicochemical reaction rate theory are used to quantify mass-conserving active flow networks. Diode networks have also been introduced in percolation problems by constructing neighbouring lattice sites that transmit connectivity or information in one direction only.

== Inside the endoplasmic reticulum ==
Active flow networks inside the endoplasmic reticulum are represented by a graph (G,N), with N nodes connected by junctions. Two time scales leads to two opposite properties, as edge can switch at random time from one direction only to the opposite one: 1- time for an edge to switch from direction to the opposite and 2-the time to move from one edge to the next one. This leads to two phenomena:

Trapping
a particle was already in the node and one edge switches an even number of times between the instant of transitions, or the particle was previously in the node and had switched to a neighbouring node before returning to the considered node.

Backtracking
a particle can jump back to the node it came from, thus wasting time by visiting again the previous node. However, in the network, this probability is affected by the direction of the edge.

Under these two effects (trapping and backtracking), the network exploration is slower when compared to a unidirectional network, where such situation does not occur. AFN models can be used to intert data extracted by fluorescence recovery after photobleaching, single particle trajectories or photoactivation.
