= Alexander V. Karzanov =

Russian mathematician (born 1947)

Alexander Viktorovich Karzanov (Russian: Александр Викторович Карзанов, born 1947) is a Russian mathematician known for his work in combinatorial optimization. He is the inventor of preflow-push based algorithms for the maximum flow problem, and the co-inventor of the Hopcroft–Karp–Karzanov algorithm for maximum matching in bipartite graphs. In 1977-2018 he was a senior, leading, chief researcher at the Federal Research Center "Computer Science and Control" (Institute for System Analysis) of the Russian Academy of Sciences. Since 2018 he is a chief researcher at Central Institute of Economics and Mathematics (CEMI) of the RAS.

Karzanov was educated at Moscow State University (in 1965-1971). With Georgy Adelson-Velsky and Yefim Dinitz he is the co-author of the book Потоковые алгоритмы [Flow algorithms] (Moscow: Nauka, 1975). He was an invited speaker at the 1990 International Congress of Mathematicians.

From 1970 until 2004 Karzanov was working in various fields of Mathematical Programming and Combinatorial Optimization. Since 2005 he is mostly working in Algebraic Combinatorics (developing combinatorial methods in Representation Theory). Since 2018 he is also conducting researches in several branches of Mathematical Economics.
