= Probabilistic analysis of algorithms =

In analysis of algorithms, probabilistic analysis of algorithms is an approach to estimate the computational complexity of an algorithm or a computational problem. It starts from an assumption about a probability distribution on the set of all possible inputs. This assumption is then used to design an efficient algorithm or to derive the complexity of a known algorithm. This approach is not the same as that of probabilistic algorithms, but the two may be combined.

For non-probabilistic, more specifically deterministic, algorithms, the most common types of probabilistic complexity estimates are the average-case complexity and the almost-always complexity. To obtain the average-case complexity, given an input distribution, the expected time of an algorithm is evaluated, whereas for the almost-always complexity estimate, it is evaluated that the algorithm admits a given complexity estimate that almost surely holds.

In probabilistic analysis of probabilistic (randomized) algorithms, the distributions or average of all possible choices in randomized steps is also taken into account, in addition to the input distributions.

== See also ==
- Amortized analysis
- Average-case complexity
- Best, worst and average case
- Random self-reducibility
- Principle of deferred decision
