= David Karger =

American computer scientist

- Born: David Ron Karger
- Education: Harvard University; Stanford University
- Known for: Karger's algorithm Chord (peer-to-peer); Consistent hashing
- Spouse: Allegra Goodman
- Awards: ACM Fellow
- Scientific career
- Fields: Information Management; Human-Computer Interaction; Semantic Web; PIM
- Workplaces: Harvard University; Stanford University; MIT; Xerox PARC
- Thesis: Random Sampling in Graph Optimization Problems (1995)
- Doctoral advisor: Rajeev Motwani
- Doctoral students: Anant Bhardwaj; Nicole Immorlica; Jaime Teevan
- Website: people.csail.mit.edu/karger

David Ron Karger is an American computer scientist who is professor and a member of the Computer Science and Artificial Intelligence Laboratory (CSAIL) at the Massachusetts Institute of Technology.

== Early life and education ==
Karger attended junior high school in Brookline, Massachusetts. His father served in the Israel Defense Forces before immigrating to the United States, and worked at MIT Lincoln Laboratories. He received a Bachelor of Arts degree from Harvard University in 1989, completed Part III at Cambridge in 1990, and received a PhD in computer science from Stanford University in 1994 advised by Rajeev Motwani.

== Research ==
Karger's work in algorithms has focused on applications of randomization to optimization problems and led to significant progress on several core problems. He is responsible for Karger's algorithm, a Monte Carlo method to compute the minimum cut of a connected graph. Karger developed the fastest minimum spanning tree algorithm to date, with Philip Klein and Robert Tarjan. They found a linear time randomized algorithm based on a combination of Borůvka's algorithm and the reverse-delete algorithm. With Ion Stoica, Robert Morris, Frans Kaashoek, and Hari Balakrishnan, he also developed Chord, one of the four original distributed hash table protocols.

Karger has conducted research in the area of information retrieval and personal information management. This work has focused on new interfaces and algorithms for helping people sift effectively through large masses of information. While at Xerox PARC, he worked on the Scatter/Gather system, which hierarchically clustered a document collection and allow the user to gather clusters at different levels and rescatter them. More recently he has been researching retrieval systems that personalize themselves to best fit their individual users' needs and behaviors, leading the Haystack project. David Karger is also part of Confer: a tool for conference attendees used by many research conferences.

== Awards ==
Karger's dissertation received the 1994 ACM doctoral dissertation award and the Mathematical Programming Society's 1997 Tucker Prize. He also received the National Academy of Sciences' 2004 Award for Initiative in Research.

== Personal ==
Karger is married to Allegra Goodman, an American writer. The couple live in Cambridge, Massachusetts and have four children, three boys and a girl.
