= ASML (disambiguation) =

ASML, formerly Advanced Semiconductor Materials Lithography, is a Dutch company that supplies photolithography systems.

ASML may also refer to:

- Atlanta, Stone Mountain and Lithonia Railway, United States (ASM&L; reporting mark: ASML)
- Aisha Steel Mills Limited, a Pakistani steel manufacturing company
- Abstract State Machine Language, a programming language
