= European Symposium on Algorithms =

Annual conference series on algorithms

- Abbreviation: ESA
- Discipline: Algorithms

Publication details
- Publisher: Springer Science+Business Media: Lecture Notes in Computer Science
- History: 1993–present
- Frequency: Annual

The European Symposium on Algorithms (ESA) is an international conference covering the field of algorithms. It has been held annually since 1993, typically in early Autumn in a different European location each year. Like most theoretical computer science conferences its contributions are strongly peer-reviewed; the articles appear in proceedings published in Springer Lecture Notes in Computer Science. Acceptance rate of ESA is 24% in 2012 in both Design and Analysis and Engineering and Applications tracks.

== History ==
The first ESA was held in 1993 and contained 35 papers. The intended scope was all research in algorithms, theoretical as well as applied, carried out in the fields of computer science and discrete mathematics. An explicit aim was to intensify the exchange between these two research communities.

=== Workshop on Algorithms Engineering ===
In 2002, ESA incorporated the conference Workshop on Algorithms Engineering (WAE). In its current format, ESA contains two distinct tracks with their own programme committees: a track on the design an analysis of algorithms, and a track on engineering and applications, together accepting around 70 contributions.

== ESA Awards ==
=== ESA Test-of-Time Award ===
The ESA Test-of-Time Award (ESA ToTA) recognizes outstanding papers in algorithms research that were published in the ESA proceedings 19–21 years ago and which are still influential and stimulating for the field today. Because the Workshop on Algorithms Engineering (WAE) merged in with ESA, the Steering Committee decided that the papers from WAE 1999 to WAE 2001 were also to be considered.

ESA Test-of-Time Award
Year	Winners	Award Committee
2022	Marianne Durand, Philippe Flajolet: Loglog Counting of Large Cardinalities (Extended Abstract). In ESA 2003 Ulrik Brandes, Marco Gaertler, Dorothea Wagner: Experiments on Graph Clustering Algorithms. In ESA 2003	Edith Cohen, Christos Zaroliagis, Andrew Goldberg
2021	Andrew Goldberg, Jason Hartline: Competitive Auctions for Multiple Digital Goods. In ESA 2001 Giuseppe Lancia, Vineet Bafna, Sorin Istrail, Ross Lippert, and Russell Schwartz: SNPs Problems, Complexity, and Algorithms. In ESA 2001	Samir Khuller, Edith Cohen, Christos Zaroliagis
2020	Rasmus Pagh, Flemming Friche Rodler: Cuckoo Hashing. In ESA 2001	Uri Zwick, Samir Khuller, Edith Cohen
2019	Ulrich Meyer, Peter Sanders: Delta-Stepping: A Parallel Single Source Shortest Path Algorithm. In ESA 1998	Giuseppe F. Italiano, Uri Zwick, Samir Khuller
2018	Bernard Chazelle: Car-Pooling as a Data Structuring Device: The Soft Heap. In ESA 1998	Giuseppe F. Italiano, Jan van Leeuwen, Uri Zwick
2017	James Abello, Adam L. Buchsbaum, and Jeffery R. Westbrook: A Functional Approach to External Graph Algorithms. In ESA 1998	Jan van Leeuwen, Kurt Mehlhorn, Mike Paterson
2016	Boris V. Cherkassky, Andrew V. Goldberg: Negative-cycle detection algorithms. In ESA 1996	Kurt Mehlhorn, Mike Paterson, Jan van Leeuwen
2015	Mechthild Stoer, Frank Wagner: A Simple Min Cut Algorithm. In ESA 1994 Sudipto Guha, Samir Khuller: Approximation Algorithms for Connected Dominating Sets. In ESA 1996	Jan van Leeuwen, Kurt Mehlhorn, Mike Paterson

=== ESA Best Paper Awards ===
ESA Best Paper Awards
Year	Track A Best Paper	Track B Best Paper	Track A Best Student Paper	Track B Best Student Paper
2022	Stefan Walzer: Insertion Time of Random Walk Cuckoo Hashing below the Peeling Threshold (extended abstract)	Chris Schwiegelshohn and Omar Ali Sheikh-Omar: An Empirical Evaluation of k-Means Coresets	Zoe Xi and William Kuszmaul: Approximating Dynamic Time Warping Distance Between Run-Length Encoded Strings	Tim Zeitz and Nils Werner: Combining Predicted and Live Traffic with Time-Dependent A* Potentials
2021	Zhiyang He, Jason Li and Magnus Wahlström: Near-linear-time, Optimal Vertex Cut Sparsifiers in Directed Acyclic Graphs	Simon D. Fink, Matthias Pfretzschner and Ignaz Rutter: Experimental Comparison of PC-Trees and PQ-Trees	Wojciech Nadara, Mateusz Radecki, Marcin Smulewicz and Marek Sokołowski: Determining 4-edge-connected components in linear time	Florian Wörz and Jan-Hendrik Lorenz: Evidence for Long-Tails in SLS Algorithms
2020	Moritz Venzin, Friedrich Eisenbrand: Approximate $CVP_{\infty}$ in time $2^{0.802 n}$	Georg Osang, Mael Rouxel-Labbé, Monique Teillaud: Generalizing CGAL Periodic Delaunay Triangulations	Hanrui Zhang: Improved Prophet Inequalities for Combinatorial Welfare Maximization with (Approximately) Subadditive Agents	
2019	Peyman Afshani, Rolf Fagerberg, David Hammer, Riko Jacob, Irina Kostitsyna, Ulrich Meyer, Manuel Penschuck and Nodari Sitchinava: Fragile Complexity of Comparison-Based Algorithms	Thomas Bläsius, Tobias Friedrich, Maximilian Katzmann, Ulrich Meyer, Manuel Penschuck and Christopher Weyand: Efficiently Generating Geometric Inhomogeneous and Hyperbolic Random Graphs	Cornelius Brand: Patching Colors with Tensors	
2018	Jacob Holm, Giuseppe F. Italiano, Adam Karczmarz, Jakub Łącki, Eva Rotenberg: Decremental SPQR-trees for Planar Graphs	Daniel R. Schmidt, Bernd Zey, François Margot: An Exact Algorithm for the Steiner Forest Problem	Maximilian Probst: On the Complexity of the (Approximate) Nearest Colored Node Problem	Max Bannach, Sebastian Berndt: Practical Access to Dynamic Programming on Tree Decompositions
2017	Marek Cygan, Lukasz Kowalik and Arkadiusz Socala: Improving TSP tours using dynamic programming over tree decompositions	Hisao Tamaki: Positive-instance driven dynamic programming for treewidth	Marc Roth: Counting restricted homomorphisms via Möbius inversion over matroid lattice	
2016	Stefan Kratsch: A randomized polynomial kernelization for Vertex Cover with a smaller parameter	Thomas Bläsius, Tobias Friedrich, Anton Krohmer and Sören Laue: Efficient Embedding of Scale-Free Graphs in the Hyperbolic Plane	Adam Kunysz: The Strongly Stable Roommates Problem	Michele Borassi and Emanuele Natale: KADABRA is an ADaptive Algorithm for Betweenness via Random Approximation

Since 2022, ESA also awards the best paper for the Simplicity Track:

- 2022. Alejandro Flores-Velazco: Improved Search of Relevant Points for Nearest-Neighbor Classification.

== ALGO conferences ==
Since 2001, ESA is co-located with other algorithms conferences and workshops in a combined meeting called ALGO. This is the largest European event devoted to algorithms, attracting hundreds of researchers.

Other events in the ALGO conferences include the following.

- WABI, the Workshop on Algorithms in Bioinformatics, is part of ALGO in most years.
- WAOA, the Workshop on Approximation and Online Algorithms, has been part of ALGO since 2003.
- ATMOS, the Workshop on Algorithmic Approaches for Transportation Modeling, Optimization and Systems, formerly the Workshop on Algorithmic Methods and Models for Optimization of Railways, has been part of ALGO in 2003–2006 and 2008–2009.
- IPEC, the International Symposium on Parameterized and Exact Computation, founded in 2004 and formerly the International Workshop on Parameterized and Exact Computation (IWPEC), is part of ALGO since 2011

ATMOS was co-located with the International Colloquium on Automata, Languages and Programming (ICALP) in 2001–2002.
