= Mechthild Stoer =

German operations researcher

- Education: University of Augsburg
- Known for: Stoer–Wagner algorithm
- Awards: European Symposium on Algorithms Test-of-Time Award
- Scientific career
- Fields: Operations research
- Institutions: Telenor
- Thesis: Design of Survivable Networks (1992)
- Academic advisors: Martin Grötschel

Mechthild Maria Stoer is a German applied mathematician and operations researcher known for her work on the minimum cut problem and in network design. She is one of the namesakes of the Stoer–Wagner algorithm for minimum cuts, which she published with Frank Wagner in 1994.

== Education and career ==
Stoer was a master's student of Martin Grötschel at the University of Augsburg in Germany, receiving a diploma in 1987 with the thesis Dekompositionstechniken beim Travelling Salesman Problem. She continued working with Grötschel in Augsburg for a Ph.D.; her 1992 dissertation, Design of Survivable Networks, was also published by Springer-Verlag in the series Lecture Notes in Mathematics (vol. 1531, 1992). After completing her doctorate she worked for Telenor in Norway, focusing on the applications of combinatorial optimization in telecommunication.

== Recognition ==
Stoer's work on minimum cuts received the inaugural European Symposium on Algorithms Test-of-Time Award in 2015. The award citation states that "The algorithm continues to be taught because of its elegance and used because of its efficiency and ease of implementation."

== Selected publications ==
- Stoer, Mechthild (1992), Design of Survivable Networks, Lecture Notes in Mathematics, vol. 1531, Berlin: Springer-Verlag, doi:10.1007/BFb0088963, ISBN 3-540-56271-0, MR 1223549
- Grötschel, Martin; Monma, Clyde L.; Stoer, Mechthild (1992), "Computational results with a cutting plane algorithm for designing communication networks with low-connectivity constraints", Operations Research, 40 (2): 309–330, doi:10.1287/opre.40.2.309, MR 1162949
- Grötschel, Martin; Monma, Clyde L.; Stoer, Mechthild (1992), "Facets for polyhedra arising in the design of communication networks with low-connectivity constraints", SIAM Journal on Optimization, 2 (3): 474–504, doi:10.1137/0802024, MR 1172502
- Stoer, Mechthild; Dahl, Geir (1994), "A polyhedral approach to multicommodity survivable network design", Numerische Mathematik, 68 (1): 149–167, doi:10.1007/s002110050054, MR 1278454
- Stoer, Mechthild; Wagner, Frank (1997), "A simple min-cut algorithm", Journal of the ACM, 44 (4): 585–591, doi:10.1145/263867.263872, MR 1481316; previously announced in 1994 at the European Symposium on Algorithms, doi:10.1007/BFb0049404
