= Atlantic City algorithm =

Type of randomized algorithm

In computing, an Atlantic City algorithm is a randomized algorithm that answers correctly at least 75% of the time. In some variant definitions, the correctness threshold may be any value greater than 50%. In either sense, Atlantic City algorithms are types of Monte Carlo algorithms.

There exists a polynomial-time Atlantic City algorithm for any problem belonging to the class BPP of bounded probabilistic polynomial-time problems.

Las Vegas algorithms, which never return an incorrect answer, are a dual of Monte Carlo algorithms and, therefore, of Atlantic City algorithms.

The name refers to Atlantic City in the U.S. state of New Jersey. Much like Monte Carlo and Las Vegas, Atlantic City is widely associated with casinos and gambling culture.

== See also ==
- Monte Carlo algorithm
- Las Vegas algorithm
