= CoreASM =

CoreASM is an open source project (licensed under Academic Free License version 3.0) that focuses on the design of a lean executable ASM (Abstract State Machines) language, in combination with a supporting tool environment for high-level design, experimental validation, and formal verification (where appropriate) of abstract system models.

Abstract state machines are known for their versatility in modeling of algorithms, architectures, languages, protocols, and virtually all kinds of sequential, parallel, and distributed systems. The ASM formalism has been studied extensively by researchers in academia and industry for more than 15 years with the intention to bridge the gap between formal and pragmatic approaches.

Model-based systems engineering can benefit from abstract executable specifications as a tool for design exploration and experimental validation through simulation and testing. Building on experiences with two generations of ASM tools, a novel executable ASM language, called CoreASM, is being developed (see CoreASM homepage).

The CoreASM language emphasizes freedom of experimentation, and supports the evolutionary nature of design as a product of creativity. It is particularly suited to Exploring the problem space for the purpose of writing an initial specification. The CoreASM language allows writing of highly abstract and concise specifications by minimizing the need for encoding in mapping the problem space to a formal model, and by allowing explicit declaration of the parts of the specification that are purposely left abstract. The principle of minimality, in combination with robustness of the underlying mathematical framework, improves modifiability of specifications, while effectively supporting the highly iterative nature of specification and design.
