= Algorithm aversion =

Biased assessment of an algorithm

Algorithm aversion is defined as a "biased assessment of an algorithm which manifests in negative behaviors, and attitudes towards the algorithm compared to a human agent." This phenomenon describes the tendency of humans to reject advice or recommendations from an algorithm in situations where they would accept the same advice if it came from a human.

Algorithms, particularly those utilizing machine learning methods or artificial intelligence (AI), play a growing role in decision-making across various fields. Examples include recommender systems in e-commerce for identifying products a customer might like and AI systems in healthcare that assist in diagnoses and treatment decisions. Despite their proven ability to outperform humans in many contexts, algorithmic recommendations are often met with resistance or rejection, which can lead to inefficiencies and suboptimal outcomes.

The study of algorithm aversion is critical as algorithms become increasingly embedded in our daily lives. Factors such as perceived accountability, lack of transparency, and skepticism towards machine judgment contribute to this aversion. Conversely, there are scenarios where individuals are more likely to trust and follow algorithmic advice over human recommendations, a phenomenon referred to as algorithm appreciation. Understanding these dynamics is essential for improving human-algorithm interactions and fostering greater acceptance of AI-driven decision-making.

== Examples of algorithm aversion ==
Algorithm aversion manifests in various domains where algorithms are employed to assist or replace human decision-making. Below are examples from diverse contexts, highlighting situations where people tend to resist algorithmic advice or decisions:

=== Healthcare ===
Patients often resist AI-based medical diagnostics and treatment recommendations, despite the proven accuracy of such systems. For instance, patients tend to trust human doctors more, as they perceive AI systems as lacking empathy and the ability to handle nuanced emotional interactions. Negative emotions are more likely to arise as AI plays a larger role in healthcare decision-making.

=== Recruitment and employment ===
Algorithmic agents used in recruitment are often perceived as less capable of fulfilling relational roles, such as providing emotional support or career development. While algorithms are trusted for transactional tasks like salary negotiations, human recruiters are favored for relational tasks due to their perceived ability to connect on an emotional level.

=== Consumer behavior ===
Consumers generally react less favorably to decisions made by algorithms compared to those made by humans. For example, when a decision results in a positive outcome, consumers find it harder to internalize the result if it comes from an algorithm. Conversely, negative outcomes tend to elicit similar responses regardless of whether the decision was made by an algorithm or a human.

=== Marketing and content creation ===
In the marketing domain, AI influencers can be as effective as human influencers in promoting products. However, trust levels remain lower for AI-driven recommendations, as consumers often perceive human influencers as more authentic. Similarly, participants tend to favor content explicitly identified as human-generated over AI-generated, even when the quality of AI content matches or surpasses human-created content.

=== Cultural differences ===
Cultural norms play a significant role in algorithm aversion. In individualistic cultures, such as in the United States, there is a higher tendency to reject algorithmic recommendations due to an emphasis on autonomy and personalized decision-making. In contrast, collectivist cultures, such as in India, exhibit lower aversion, particularly when familiarity with algorithms is higher or when decisions align with societal norms.

=== Moral and emotional decisions ===
Algorithms are less trusted for tasks involving moral or emotional judgment, such as ethical dilemmas or empathetic decision-making. For example, individuals may reject algorithmic decisions in scenarios where they perceive moral stakes to be high, such as autonomous vehicle decisions or medical life-or-death situations.

== Mechanisms underlying algorithm aversion ==
Algorithm aversion arises from a combination of psychological, task-related, cultural, and design-related factors. These mechanisms interact to shape individuals' negative perceptions and behaviors toward algorithms, even in cases where algorithmic performance is objectively superior to human decision-making.

=== Psychological mechanisms ===
==== Perceived responsibility ====
Individuals often feel a heightened sense of accountability when using algorithmic advice compared to human advice. This stems from the belief that, if a decision goes wrong, they will be solely responsible because an algorithm lacks the capacity to share blame. By contrast, decisions made with human input are perceived as more collaborative, allowing for shared accountability. For example, users are less likely to rely on algorithmic recommendations in high-stakes domains like healthcare or financial advising, where the repercussions of errors are significant.

==== Locus of control ====
People with an internal locus of control, who believe they have direct influence over outcomes, are more reluctant to trust algorithms. They may perceive algorithmic decision-making as undermining their autonomy, preferring human input that feels more modifiable or personal. Conversely, individuals with an external locus of control, who attribute outcomes to external forces, may accept algorithmic decisions more readily, viewing algorithms as neutral and effective tools. This tendency is particularly evident in decision-making contexts where users seek to maintain agency.

==== Neuroticism ====
Neurotic individuals are more prone to anxiety and fear of uncertainty, making them less likely to trust algorithms. This aversion may be fueled by concerns about the perceived "coldness" of algorithms or their inability to account for nuanced emotional factors. For example, in emotionally sensitive tasks like healthcare or recruitment, neurotic individuals may reject algorithmic inputs in favor of human recommendations, even when the algorithm performs equally well or better.

=== Task-related mechanisms ===
==== Task complexity and risk ====
The nature of the task significantly influences algorithm aversion. For routine and low-risk tasks, such as recommending movies or predicting product preferences, users are generally comfortable relying on algorithms. However, for high-stakes or subjective tasks, such as making medical diagnoses, financial decisions, or moral judgments, algorithm aversion increases. Users perceive these tasks as requiring empathy, ethical reasoning, or nuanced understanding—qualities that they believe algorithms lack. This disparity highlights why algorithms are better received in technical fields (e.g., logistics) but face resistance in human-centric domains.

==== Outcome valence ====
People's reactions to algorithmic decisions are influenced by the nature of the decision outcome. When algorithms deliver positive results, users are more likely to trust and accept them. However, when outcomes are negative, users are more inclined to reject algorithms and attribute blame to their use. This phenomenon is linked to the perception that algorithms lack accountability, unlike human decision-makers, who can offer justifications or accept responsibility for failures.

=== Cultural mechanisms ===
==== Individualism vs. collectivism ====
Cultural norms significantly shape attitudes toward algorithmic decision-making. In individualistic cultures, such as the United States, people value autonomy and personalization, making them more skeptical of algorithmic systems that they perceive as impersonal or rigid. Conversely, in collectivist cultures like India, individuals are more likely to accept algorithmic recommendations, particularly when these systems align with group norms or social expectations. Familiarity with algorithms in collectivist societies also reduces aversion, as users view algorithms as tools to reinforce societal goals rather than threats to individual autonomy.

==== Cultural influences ====
Cultural norms and values significantly impact algorithm acceptance. Individualistic cultures, such as those in the United States, tend to display higher algorithm aversion due to an emphasis on autonomy, personal agency, and distrust of generalized systems. On the other hand, collectivist cultures, such as in India, exhibit greater acceptance of algorithms, particularly when familiarity is high and the decision aligns with societal norms. These differences highlight the importance of tailoring algorithmic systems to align with cultural expectations.

==== Organizational support ====
The role of organizations in supporting and explaining the use of algorithms can greatly influence aversion levels. When organizations actively promote algorithmic tools and provide training on their usage, employees are less likely to resist them. Transparency about how algorithms support decision-making processes fosters trust and reduces anxiety, particularly in high-stakes or workplace settings.

=== Agency and role of the algorithm ===
==== Advisory vs. autonomous algorithms ====
Algorithm aversion is higher for autonomous systems that make decisions independently (performative algorithms) compared to advisory systems that provide recommendations but allow humans to retain final decision-making power. Users tend to view advisory algorithms as supportive tools that enhance their control, whereas autonomous algorithms may be perceived as threatening to their authority or ability to intervene.

==== Perceived capabilities of the algorithm ====
Algorithms are often perceived as lacking human-specific skills, such as empathy or moral reasoning. This perception leads to greater aversion in tasks involving subjective judgment, ethical dilemmas, or emotional interactions. Users are generally more accepting of algorithms in objective, technical tasks where human qualities are less critical.

=== Social and human-agent characteristics ===
==== Expertise ====
In high-stakes or expertise-intensive tasks, users tend to favor human experts over algorithms. This preference stems from the belief that human experts can account for context, nuance, and situational complexity in ways that algorithms cannot. Algorithm aversion is particularly pronounced when humans with expertise are available as an alternative to the algorithm.

==== Social distance ====
Users are more likely to reject algorithms when the alternative is their own input or the input of someone they know and relate to personally. In contrast, when the alternative is an anonymous or distant human agent, algorithms may be viewed more favorably. This preference for closer, more relatable human agents highlights the importance of perceived social connection in algorithmic decision acceptance.

=== Design-related mechanisms ===
==== Transparency ====
A lack of transparency in algorithmic systems, often referred to as the "black box" problem, creates distrust among users. Without clear explanations of how decisions are made, users may feel uneasy relying on algorithmic outputs, particularly in high-stakes scenarios. For instance, transparency in medical AI systems—such as providing explanations for diagnostic recommendations—can significantly improve trust and reduce aversion. Transparent algorithms empower users by demystifying decision-making processes, making them feel more in control.

==== Error tolerance ====
Users are generally less forgiving of algorithmic errors than human errors, even when the frequency of errors is lower for algorithms. This heightened scrutiny stems from the belief that algorithms should be "perfect" or error-free, unlike humans, who are expected to make mistakes. However, algorithms that demonstrate the ability to learn from their mistakes and adapt over time can foster greater trust. For example, users are more likely to accept algorithms in financial forecasting if they observe improvements based on feedback.

==== Anthropomorphic design ====
Designing algorithms with human-like traits, such as avatars, conversational interfaces, or relatable language, can reduce aversion by making interactions feel more natural and personal. For instance, AI-powered chatbots with empathetic communication styles are better received in customer service than purely mechanical interfaces. This design strategy helps mitigate the perception that algorithms are "cold" or impersonal, encouraging users to engage with them more comfortably.

=== Delivery factors ===
==== Mode of delivery ====
The format in which algorithms present their recommendations significantly affects user trust. Systems that use conversational or audio interfaces are generally more trusted than those relying solely on textual outputs, as they create a sense of human-like interaction.

==== Presentation style ====
Algorithms that provide clear, concise, and well-organized explanations of their recommendations are more likely to gain user acceptance. Systems that offer detailed yet accessible insights into their decision-making process are perceived as more reliable and trustworthy.

=== General distrust and favoritism toward humans ===
==== Default skepticism ====
Many individuals harbor an ingrained skepticism toward algorithms, particularly when they lack familiarity with the system or its capabilities. Early negative experiences with algorithms can entrench this distrust, making it difficult to rebuild confidence. Even when algorithms perform better, this bias often persists, leading to outright rejection.

==== Favoritism toward humans ====
People often display a preference for human decisions over algorithmic ones, particularly for positive outcomes. Yalsin et al. highlighted that individuals are more likely to internalize favorable decisions made by humans, attributing success to human expertise or effort. In contrast, decisions made by algorithms are viewed as impersonal, reducing the sense of achievement or satisfaction. This favoritism contributes to a persistent bias against algorithmic systems, even when their performance matches or exceeds that of humans.

=== Reputational concerns ===
People may also be averse to using algorithms if doing so conveys negative information about the human's ability. This can occur if humans have private information about their own ability.

== Proposed methods to overcome algorithm aversion ==
Algorithms are often capable of outperforming humans or performing tasks much more cost-effectively. Despite this, algorithm aversion persists due to a range of psychological, cultural, and design-related factors. To mitigate resistance and build trust, researchers and practitioners have proposed several strategies.

=== Human-in-the-loop ===
One effective way to reduce algorithmic aversion is by incorporating a human-in-the-loop approach, where the human decision-maker retains control over the final decision. This approach addresses concerns about agency and accountability by positioning algorithms as advisory tools rather than autonomous decision-makers.

==== Advisory role ====
Algorithms can provide recommendations while leaving the ultimate decision-making authority with humans. This allows users to view algorithms as supportive rather than threatening. For example, in healthcare, AI systems can suggest diagnoses or treatments, but the human doctor makes the final call.

==== Collaboration and trust ====
Integrating humans into algorithmic processes fosters a sense of collaboration and encourages users to engage with the system more openly. This method is particularly effective in domains where human intuition and context are critical, such as recruitment, education, and financial planning.

=== System transparency ===
Transparency is crucial for overcoming algorithm aversion, as it helps to build trust and reduce the "black box" effect that often causes discomfort among users. Providing explanations about how algorithms work enables users to understand and evaluate their recommendations. Transparency can take several forms, such as global explanations that describe the overall functioning of an algorithm, case-specific explanations that clarify why a particular recommendation was made, or confidence levels that highlight the algorithm's certainty in its decisions. For example, in financial advising, transparency about how investment recommendations are generated can increase user confidence in the system. Explainable AI (XAI) methods, such as visualizations of decision pathways or feature importance metrics, make these explanations accessible and comprehensible, allowing users to make informed decisions about whether to trust the algorithm.

=== User training ===
Familiarizing users with algorithms through training can significantly reduce aversion, especially for those who are unfamiliar or skeptical. Training programs that simulate real-world interactions with algorithms allow users to see their capabilities and limitations firsthand. For instance, healthcare professionals using diagnostic AI systems can benefit from hands-on training that demonstrates how the system arrives at recommendations and how to interpret its outputs. Such training helps bridge knowledge gaps and demystifies algorithms, making users more comfortable with their use. Furthermore, repeated interactions and feedback loops help users build trust in the system over time. Financial incentives, such as rewards for accurate decisions made with the help of algorithms, have also been shown to encourage users to engage more readily with these systems.

=== Incorporating user control ===
Allowing users to interact with and adjust algorithmic outputs can greatly enhance their sense of control, which is a key factor in overcoming aversion. For example, interactive interfaces that let users modify parameters, simulate outcomes, or personalize recommendations make algorithms feel less rigid and more adaptable. Providing confidence thresholds that users can adjust—such as setting stricter criteria for medical diagnoses—further empowers them to feel involved in the decision-making process. Feedback mechanisms are another important feature, as they allow users to provide input or correct errors, fostering a sense of collaboration between the user and the algorithm. These design features not only reduce resistance but also demonstrate that algorithms are flexible tools rather than fixed, inflexible systems.

=== Personalization and customization ===
Personalization is another critical factor in reducing algorithm aversion. Algorithms that adapt to individual preferences or contexts are more likely to gain user acceptance. For instance, recommendation systems in e-commerce that learn a user's shopping habits over time are often trusted more than generic systems. Customization features, such as the ability to prioritize certain factors (e.g., cost or sustainability in product recommendations), further enhance user satisfaction by aligning outputs with their unique needs. In healthcare, personalized AI systems that incorporate a patient's medical history and specific conditions are better received than generalized tools. By tailoring outputs to the user's preferences and circumstances, algorithms can foster greater engagement and trust.

== Algorithm appreciation ==
Studies do not consistently show people demonstrating bias against algorithms and sometimes show the opposite, preferring advice from an algorithm instead of a human. This effect is called algorithm appreciation. Results are mixed, showing that people sometimes seem to prefer advice that comes from an algorithm instead of a human.

For example, customers are more likely to indicate initial interest to human sales agents compared to automated sales agents but less likely to provide contact information to them. This is due to "lower levels of performance expectancy and effort expectancy associated with human sales agents versus automated sales agents".
