= Nicole Immorlica =

Theoretical computer scientist

Nicole Immorlica (born November 26, 1978) is a theoretical computer scientist at Yale University and Microsoft Research, known for her work on algorithmic game theory and locality-sensitive hashing.

== Education and career ==
Immorlica completed her Ph.D. in 2005 at the Massachusetts Institute of Technology, under the joint supervision of David Karger and Erik Demaine. Her dissertation was Computing with Strategic Agents.

After postdoctoral research at Microsoft Research and at the Centrum Wiskunde & Informatica in Amsterdam, Immorlica took a faculty position at Northwestern University in 2008, and moved to Microsoft Research in 2012.

== Service ==
In 2019, Immorlica was elected chair of SIGecom, the Association for Computing Machinery Special Interest Group on Economics and Computation.

== Recognition ==
Immorlica was named as an ACM Fellow, in the 2023 class of fellows, for "contributions to economics and computation, including market design, auctions and social networks".
