= Karger's algorithm =

Randomized algorithm for minimum cuts

A graph and two of its cuts. The dotted line in red is a cut with three crossing edges. The dashed line in green is a min-cut of this graph, crossing only two edges.

In computer science and graph theory, Karger's algorithm is a randomized algorithm to compute a minimum cut of a connected graph. It was invented by David Karger and first published in 1993.

The idea of the algorithm is based on the concept of contraction of an edge $(u, v)$ in an undirected graph $G = (V, E)$. Informally, the contraction of an edge merges the nodes $u$ and $v$ into one, reducing the total number of nodes of the graph by one. All other edges connecting either $u$ or $v$ are "reattached" to the merged node, effectively producing a multigraph. Karger's basic algorithm iteratively contracts randomly chosen edges until only two nodes remain; those nodes represent a cut in the original graph. By iterating this basic algorithm a sufficient number of times, a minimum cut can be found with high probability.

== The global minimum cut problem ==
A cut $(S,T)$ in an undirected graph $G = (V, E)$ is a partition of the vertices $V$ into two non-empty, disjoint sets $S\cup T= V$. The cutset of a cut consists of the edges $\{\, uv \in E \colon u\in S, v\in T\,\}$ between the two parts. The size (or weight) of a cut in an unweighted graph is the cardinality of the cutset, i.e., the number of edges between the two parts,

$$w(S,T) = |\{\, uv \in E \colon u\in S, v\in T\,\}|\,.$$

There are $2^{|V|}$ ways of choosing for each vertex whether it belongs to $S$ or to $T$, but two of these choices make $S$ or $T$ empty and do not give rise to cuts. Among the remaining choices, swapping the roles of $S$ and $T$ does not change the cut, so each cut is counted twice; therefore, there are $2^{|V|-1}-1$ distinct cuts. The minimum cut problem is to find a cut of smallest size among these cuts.

For weighted graphs with positive edge weights $w\colon E\rightarrow \mathbf R^+$ the weight of the cut is the sum of the weights of edges between vertices in each part

$$w(S,T) = \sum_{uv\in E\colon u\in S, v\in T} w(uv)\,,$$

which agrees with the unweighted definition for $w=1$.

A cut is sometimes called a “global cut” to distinguish it from an “$s$-$t$ cut” for a given pair of vertices, which has the additional requirement that $s\in S$ and $t\in T$. Every global cut is an $s$-$t$ cut for some $s,t\in V$. Thus, the minimum cut problem can be solved in polynomial time by iterating over all choices of $s,t\in V$ and solving the resulting minimum $s$-$t$ cut problem using the max-flow min-cut theorem and a polynomial time algorithm for maximum flow, such as the push-relabel algorithm, though this approach is not optimal. Better deterministic algorithms for the global minimum cut problem include the Stoer–Wagner algorithm, which has a running time of $O(mn+n^2\log n)$.

== Contraction algorithm ==
The fundamental operation of Karger’s algorithm is a form of edge contraction. The result of contracting the edge $e=\{u,v\}$ is a new node $uv$. Every edge $\{w,u\}$ or $\{w,v\}$ for $w\notin\{u,v\}$ to the endpoints of the contracted edge is replaced by an edge $\{w,uv\}$ to the new node. Finally, the contracted nodes $u$ and $v$ with all their incident edges are removed. In particular, the resulting graph contains no self-loops. The result of contracting edge $e$ is denoted $G/e$.

The contraction algorithm repeatedly contracts random edges in the graph, until only two nodes remain, at which point there is only a single cut.

The key idea of the algorithm is that it is far more likely for non min-cut edges than min-cut edges to be randomly selected and lost to contraction, since min-cut edges are usually vastly outnumbered by non min-cut edges. Subsequently, it is plausible that the min-cut edges will survive all the edge contraction, and the algorithm will correctly identify the min-cut edge.

Successful run of Karger’s algorithm on a 10-vertex graph. The minimum cut has size 3.

   procedure contract(
  
    
      
        G
        =
        (
        V
        ,
        E
        )
      
    
    {\displaystyle G=(V,E)}
  
):
   while 
  
    
      
        
          |
        
        V
        
          |
        
        >
        2
      
    
    {\displaystyle |V|>2}
  

       choose 
  
    
      
        e
        ∈
        E
      
    
    {\displaystyle e\in E}
  
 uniformly at random
       
  
    
      
        G
        ←
        G
        
          /
        
        e
      
    
    {\displaystyle G\leftarrow G/e}
  

   return the only cut in 
  
    
      
        G
      
    
    {\displaystyle G}
  

When the graph is represented using adjacency lists or an adjacency matrix, a single edge contraction operation can be implemented with a linear number of updates to the data structure, for a total running time of $O(|V|^2)$. Alternatively, the procedure can be viewed as an execution of Kruskal’s algorithm for constructing the minimum spanning tree in a graph where the edges have weights $w(e_i)=\pi(i)$ according to a random permutation $\pi$. Removing the heaviest edge of this tree results in two components that describe a cut. In this way, the contraction procedure can be implemented like Kruskal’s algorithm in time $O(|E|\log |E|)$.

The random edge choices in Karger’s algorithm correspond to an execution of Kruskal’s algorithm on a graph with random edge ranks until only two components remain.

The best known implementations use $O(|E|)$ time and space, or $O(|E|\log |E|)$ time and $O(|V|)$ space, respectively.

=== Success probability of the contraction algorithm ===
In a graph $G=(V,E)$ with $n=|V|$ vertices, the contraction algorithm returns a minimum cut with polynomially small probability $\binom{n}{2}^{-1}$. Recall that every graph has $2^{n-1} -1$ cuts (by the discussion in the previous section), among which at most $\tbinom{n}{2}$ can be minimum cuts. Therefore, the success probability for this algorithm is much better than the probability for picking a cut at random, which is at most $\frac{\tbinom{n}{2}}{2^{n-1} -1}$.

For instance, the cycle graph on $n$ vertices has exactly $\binom{n}{2}$ minimum cuts, given by every choice of 2 edges. The contraction procedure finds each of these with equal probability.

To further establish the lower bound on the success probability, let $C$ denote the edges of a specific minimum cut of size $k$. The contraction algorithm returns $C$ if none of the random edges deleted by the algorithm belongs to the cutset $C$. In particular, the first edge contraction avoids $C$, which happens with probability $1-k/|E|$. The minimum degree of $G$ is at least $k$ (otherwise a minimum degree vertex would induce a smaller cut where one of the two partitions contains only the minimum degree vertex), so $|E|\geqslant nk/2$. Thus, the probability that the contraction algorithm picks an edge from $C$ is

$$\frac{k}{|E|} \leqslant \frac{k}{nk/2} = \frac{2}{n}.$$

The probability $p_n$ that the contraction algorithm on an $n$-vertex graph avoids $C$ satisfies the recurrence $p_n \geqslant \left( 1 - \frac{2}{n} \right) p_{n-1}$, with $p_2 = 1$, which can be expanded as

$$p_n \geqslant \prod_{i=0}^{n-3} \Bigl(1-\frac{2}{n-i}\Bigr) =
\prod_{i=0}^{n-3} {\frac{n-i-2}{n-i}}
= \frac{n-2}{n}\cdot \frac{n-3}{n-1} \cdot \frac{n-4}{n-2}\cdots \frac{3}{5}\cdot \frac{2}{4} \cdot \frac{1}{3}
= \binom{n}{2}^{-1}\,.$$

=== Repeating the contraction algorithm ===
10 repetitions of the contraction procedure. The 5th repetition finds the minimum cut of size 3.

By repeating the contraction algorithm $T = \binom{n}{2}\ln n$ times with independent random choices and returning the smallest cut, the probability of not finding a minimum cut is

$$\left[1-\binom{n}{2}^{-1}\right]^T
\leq \frac{1}{e^{\ln n}} = \frac{1}{n}\,.$$

The total running time for $T$ repetitions for a graph with $n$ vertices and $m$ edges is $O(Tm) = O(n^2 m \log n)$.

== Karger–Stein algorithm ==
An extension of Karger’s algorithm due to David Karger and Clifford Stein achieves an order of magnitude improvement.

The basic idea is to perform the contraction procedure until the graph reaches $t$ vertices.

   procedure contract(
  
    
      
        G
        =
        (
        V
        ,
        E
        )
      
    
    {\displaystyle G=(V,E)}
  
, 
  
    
      
        t
      
    
    {\displaystyle t}
  
):
   while 
  
    
      
        
          |
        
        V
        
          |
        
        >
        t
      
    
    {\displaystyle |V|>t}
  

       choose 
  
    
      
        e
        ∈
        E
      
    
    {\displaystyle e\in E}
  
 uniformly at random
       
  
    
      
        G
        ←
        G
        
          /
        
        e
      
    
    {\displaystyle G\leftarrow G/e}
  

   return 
  
    
      
        G
      
    
    {\displaystyle G}
  

The probability $p_{n,t}$ that this contraction procedure avoids a specific cut $C$ in an $n$-vertex graph is

$p_{n,t} \ge \prod_{i=0}^{n-t-1} \Bigl(1-\frac{2}{n-i}\Bigr) = \binom{t}{2}\Bigg/\binom{n}{2}\,.$

This expression is approximately $t^2/n^2$ and becomes less than $\frac{1}{2}$ around $t= n/\sqrt 2$. In particular, the probability that an edge from $C$ is contracted grows towards the end. This motivates the idea of switching to a slower algorithm after a certain number of contraction steps.

   procedure fastmincut(
  
    
      
        G
        =
        (
        V
        ,
        E
        )
      
    
    {\displaystyle G=(V,E)}
  
):
   if 
  
    
      
        
          |
        
        V
        
          |
        
        ≤
        6
      
    
    {\displaystyle |V|\leq 6}
  
:
       return contract(
  
    
      
        G
      
    
    {\displaystyle G}
  
, 
  
    
      
        2
      
    
    {\displaystyle 2}
  
)
   else:
       
  
    
      
        t
        ←
        ⌈
        1
        +
        
          |
        
        V
        
          |
        
        
          /
        
        
          
            2
          
        
        ⌉
      
    
    {\displaystyle t\leftarrow \lceil 1+|V|/{\sqrt {2}}\rceil }
  

       
  
    
      
        
          G
          
            1
          
        
        ←
      
    
    {\displaystyle G_{1}\leftarrow }
  
 contract(
  
    
      
        G
      
    
    {\displaystyle G}
  
, 
  
    
      
        t
      
    
    {\displaystyle t}
  
)
       
  
    
      
        
          G
          
            2
          
        
        ←
      
    
    {\displaystyle G_{2}\leftarrow }
  
 contract(
  
    
      
        G
      
    
    {\displaystyle G}
  
, 
  
    
      
        t
      
    
    {\displaystyle t}
  
)
       return min{fastmincut(
  
    
      
        
          G
          
            1
          
        
      
    
    {\displaystyle G_{1}}
  
), fastmincut(
  
    
      
        
          G
          
            2
          
        
      
    
    {\displaystyle G_{2}}
  
)}

=== Analysis ===
The contraction parameter $t$ is chosen so that each call to contract has probability at least 1/2 of success (that is, of avoiding the contraction of an edge from a specific cutset $C$). This allows the successful part of the recursion tree to be modeled as a random binary tree generated by a critical Galton–Watson process, and to be analyzed accordingly.

The probability $P(n)$ that this random tree of successful calls contains a long-enough path to reach the base of the recursion and find $C$ is given by the recurrence relation

$$P(n)= 1-\left(1-\frac{1}{2} P\left(\Bigl\lceil 1 + \frac{n}{\sqrt{2}}\Bigr\rceil \right)\right)^2$$

with solution $P(n) = \Omega\left(\frac{1}{\log n}\right)$. The running time of fastmincut satisfies

$$T(n)= 2T\left(\Bigl\lceil 1+\frac{n}{\sqrt{2}}\Bigr\rceil\right)+O(n^2)$$

with solution $T(n)=O(n^2\log n)$. To achieve error probability $O(1/n)$, the algorithm can be repeated $O(\log n/P(n))$ times, for an overall running time of $T(n) \cdot \frac{\log n}{P(n)} = O(n^2\log ^3 n)$. This is an order of magnitude improvement over Karger’s original algorithm.

=== Improvement bound ===
To determine a min-cut, one has to touch every edge in the graph at least once, which is $\Theta(n^2)$ time in a dense graph. The Karger–Stein's min-cut algorithm takes the running time of $O(n^2\ln ^{O(1)} n)$, which is very close to that.
