= Abstract State Machine Language =

Programming language

AsmL
- Paradigm: functional
- Designed by: Microsoft Corporation

Major implementations
- XASM

Abstract State Machine Language (AsmL) is a programming language based on abstract state machines developed by Microsoft. AsmL is a functional language.

AsmL is a high‑level functional language created at Microsoft Research that allows developers to model, formally specify, and test system behaviors using the abstract state machine approach, with seamless integration into the .NET framework.

XASM is an open-source implementation of the language. XASM provides a component‑based modularization concept with compiler support translating XASM specifications into C, enabling efficient execution of models and aiding in the development of reusable abstract state machine components.
