= Spec Explorer =

- Developer(s): Microsoft
- Stable release: 2010 Release 3.5.3146.0 / July 8, 2013; 11 years ago
- Operating system: Microsoft Windows
- Type: Model-Based Testing tool

Spec Explorer is a Model-Based Testing (MBT) tool from Microsoft. It extends the Visual Studio Integrated Development Environment with the ability to define a model describing the expected behavior of a software system. From these models, the tool can generate tests automatically for execution within Visual Studio's own testing framework, or many other unit testing frameworks.

The concepts behind Spec Explorer and the tool itself have been described in several publications and presented in multiple academic and industry events.

The latest version can be downloaded from Visual Studio Gallery. Technical information can be found in the Microsoft documentation. Community and engineering team support can be obtained through the Spec Explorer Forum, while the Spec Explorer Team Blog provides detailed articles and guidance.
