= Henry Cabourn Pocklington =

English physicist and mathematician

Henry Cabourn Pocklington FRS (28 January 1870, Exeter – 15 May 1952, Leeds) was an English physicist and mathematician. His primary profession was as a schoolmaster, but he made important contributions to number theory with the discovery of Pocklington's primality test in 1914 and the invention of Pocklington's algorithm. He also derived the first equation for the current in a wire antenna, Pocklington's integral equation.
