= Satya Prakash =

Satya Prakash may refer to:

- Satya Prakash (physicist)
- Satya Prakash (actor)
- D. Satya Prakash, Indian filmmaker
