= Satish B. Rao =

American computer scientist and educator

- Education: Massachusetts Institute of Technology (PhD, 1989)
- Known for: Graph partitioning; Approximation algorithms; multicommodity flow; metric embeddings
- Awards: Fulkerson Prize (2012); ACM Fellow (2013)
- Scientific career
- Fields: Theoretical computer science; Algorithms; Combinatorial optimization; Computational biology
- Workplaces: NEC Laboratories; University of California, Berkeley
- Doctoral advisor: Frank Thomson Leighton

Satish B. Rao is an American computer scientist and professor of computer science at the University of California, Berkeley. His research is in the design and analysis of algorithms, with work in combinatorial optimization, graph partitioning, network flow, metric embeddings, and computational biology.

Rao received the Fulkerson Prize in 2012 with Sanjeev Arora and Umesh Vazirani for their work on approximation algorithms for the sparsest cut problem. He was named an ACM Fellow in 2013 for contributions to algorithms for graph partitioning and for single- and multi-commodity flows.

== Biography ==
Rao received his PhD from the Massachusetts Institute of Technology in 1989. The Mathematics Genealogy Project lists Frank Thomson Leighton as his doctoral advisor. After completing his doctorate, Rao held a scientist position at NEC Laboratories until 1999, when he joined the faculty of the University of California, Berkeley.

At Berkeley, Rao is a professor in the Department of Electrical Engineering and Computer Sciences. Berkeley lists his research areas as biosystems and computational biology, and theory, and his research interests as combinatorial optimization and the design and analysis of algorithms. He is affiliated with the Simons Institute for the Theory of Computing and the Center for the Theoretical Foundations of Learning, Inference, Information, Intelligence, Mathematics and Microeconomics at Berkeley. His teaching at Berkeley has included discrete mathematics and probability theory, as well as graduate courses in combinatorial algorithms and data structures.

== Political campaign ==
In 2026, Rao was listed by the California Secretary of State as a candidate for Governor of California in the June 2 statewide direct primary election, with Democratic Party preference and the ballot designation "Professor". His candidate statement appeared in the state's official voter information guide. The South Asian Times reported that Rao's campaign focused on education reform and administrative efficiency. However he ultimately secured just 0.06% of the votes and was eliminated in the primary.

== Research ==
Rao's research has focused on approximation algorithms and optimization problems involving graphs, cuts, flows, and embeddings. With Leighton, he developed multicommodity max-flow min-cut theorems and applied them to approximation algorithms for graph partitioning and other NP-hard optimization problems. The paper was part of a line of work connecting network flows, separators, and approximation guarantees for difficult graph problems.

Rao has also worked on maximum-flow algorithms. With Andrew V. Goldberg, he coauthored "Beyond the Flow Decomposition Barrier", which introduced a maximum-flow approach based on residual capacities and length functions. In metric embeddings, Rao coauthored the Fakcharoenphol–Rao–Talwar paper giving a tight logarithmic bound for approximating finite metrics by tree metrics.

With Arora and Vazirani, Rao developed the expander-flow method for graph partitioning. Their Journal of the ACM paper, "Expander flows, geometric embeddings and graph partitioning", improved the approximation ratio for graph separators and related problems from $O(\log n)$ to $O(\sqrt{\log n})$. This work received the 2012 Fulkerson Prize.

Rao's publication record also includes work in computational biology, including graph-based approaches for detecting population substructure and methods related to phylogenetic tree estimation.

== Awards and honors ==
Rao was named a Fellow of the Association for Computing Machinery in 2013 for "contributions to algorithms for graph partitioning and for single- and multi-commodity flows". In 2012, he received the Fulkerson Prize with Arora and Vazirani for "Expander flows, geometric embeddings and graph partitioning".

== Selected publications ==
- Leighton, Frank Thomson; Maggs, Bruce M.; Rao, Satish (1994). "Packet routing and job-shop scheduling in O(congestion + dilation) steps". Combinatorica. 14 (2): 167–186. doi:10.1007/BF01215349.
- Goldberg, Andrew V.; Rao, Satish (1998). "Beyond the flow decomposition barrier". Journal of the ACM. 45 (5): 783–797. doi:10.1145/290179.290181.
- Leighton, Tom; Rao, Satish (1999). "Multicommodity max-flow min-cut theorems and their use in designing approximation algorithms". Journal of the ACM. 46 (6): 787–832. doi:10.1145/331524.331526.
- Even, Guy; Naor, Joseph; Rao, Satish; Schieber, Baruch (2000). "Divide-and-conquer approximation algorithms using spreading metrics". Journal of the ACM. 47 (4): 585–616. doi:10.1145/347476.347478.
- Fakcharoenphol, Jittat; Rao, Satish; Talwar, Kunal (2003). "A tight bound on approximating arbitrary metrics by tree metrics". Proceedings of the 35th Annual ACM Symposium on Theory of Computing. Association for Computing Machinery. pp. 448–455. doi:10.1145/780542.780608.
- Fakcharoenphol, Jittat; Rao, Satish; Talwar, Kunal (2004). "A tight bound on approximating arbitrary metrics by tree metrics". Journal of Computer and System Sciences. 69 (3): 485–497. doi:10.1016/j.jcss.2004.04.011.
- Rao, Satish (1999). "Small distortion and volume preserving embeddings for planar and Euclidean metrics". Proceedings of the Fifteenth Annual Symposium on Computational Geometry. Association for Computing Machinery. pp. 300–306. doi:10.1145/304893.304983.
- Arora, Sanjeev; Rao, Satish; Vazirani, Umesh (2009). "Expander flows, geometric embeddings and graph partitioning". Journal of the ACM. 56 (2): 1–37. doi:10.1145/1502793.1502794.
- Biswal, Punyashloka; Lee, James R.; Rao, Satish (2010). "Eigenvalue bounds, spectral partitioning, and metrical deformations via flows". Journal of the ACM. 57 (3): 1–23. doi:10.1145/1706591.1706593.
- Le, Thien; Sy, Aaron; Molloy, Erin K.; Zhang, Qiuyi; Rao, Satish; Warnow, Tandy J. (2021). "Using Constrained-INC for large-scale gene tree and species tree estimation". IEEE/ACM Transactions on Computational Biology and Bioinformatics. 18 (1): 2–15. doi:10.1109/TCBB.2019.2947041.
- Henzinger, Monika; Li, Jason; Rao, Satish; Wang, Di (2024). "Deterministic near-linear time minimum cut in weighted graphs". Proceedings of the 2024 Annual ACM-SIAM Symposium on Discrete Algorithms. Society for Industrial and Applied Mathematics. pp. 3089–3139.
