= Multi-commodity flow problem =

Network flow problem (mathematics)

The multi-commodity flow problem is a network flow problem with multiple commodities (flow demands) between different source and sink nodes.

== Definition ==
Given a flow network $\,G(V,E)$, where edge $(u,v) \in E$ has capacity $\,c(u,v)$. There are $\,k$ commodities $K_1,K_2,\dots,K_k$, defined by $\,K_i=(s_i,t_i,d_i)$, where $\,s_i$ and $\,t_i$ is the source and sink of commodity $\,i$, and $\,d_i$ is its demand. The variable $\,f_i(u,v)$ defines the fraction of flow $\,i$ along edge $\,(u,v)$, where $\,f_i(u,v) \in [0,1]$ in case the flow can be split among multiple paths, and $\,f_i(u,v) \in \{0,1\}$ otherwise (i.e. "single path routing"). Find an assignment of all flow variables which satisfies the following four constraints:

(1) Link capacity: The sum of all flows routed over a link does not exceed its capacity.

$$\forall (u,v)\in E:\,\sum_{i=1}^{k} f_i(u,v)\cdot d_i \leq c(u,v)$$

(2) Flow conservation on transit nodes: The amount of a flow entering an intermediate node $u$ is the same that exits the node.

$$\forall i\in\{1,\ldots,k\}:\,\sum_{(u,w) \in E} f_i(u,w) - \sum_{(w,u) \in E} f_i(w,u) = 0 \quad \mathrm{when} \quad u \neq s_i, t_i$$

(3) Flow conservation at the source: A flow must exit its source node completely.

$$\forall i\in\{1,\ldots,k\}:\,\sum_{(s_i,w) \in E} f_i(s_i,w) - \sum_{(w,s_i) \in E} f_i(w,s_i) = 1$$

(4) Flow conservation at the destination: A flow must enter its sink node completely.

$$\forall i\in\{1,\ldots,k\}: \,\sum_{(w,t_i) \in E} f_i(w,t_i) - \sum_{(t_i,w) \in E} f_i(t_i,w) = 1$$

== Corresponding optimization problems ==
Load balancing is the attempt to route flows such that the utilization $U(u,v)$ of all links $(u,v)\in E$ is even, where

$$U(u,v)=\frac{\sum_{i=1}^{k} f_i(u,v)\cdot d_i}{c(u,v)}$$

The problem can be solved e.g. by minimizing $\sum_{u,v\in V} (U(u,v))^2$. A common linearization of this problem is the minimization of the maximum utilization $U_{max}$, where

$$\forall (u,v)\in E:\, U_{max} \geq U(u,v)$$

In the minimum cost multi-commodity flow problem, there is a cost $a(u,v) \cdot f(u,v)$ for sending a flow on $\,(u,v)$. You then need to minimize

$$\sum_{(u,v) \in E} \left( a(u,v) \sum_{i=1}^{k} f_i(u,v)\cdot d_i \right)$$

In the maximum multi-commodity flow problem, the demand of each commodity is not fixed, and the total throughput is maximized by maximizing the sum of all demands $\sum_{i=1}^{k} d_i$

== Relation to other problems ==
The minimum cost variant of the multi-commodity flow problem is a generalization of the minimum cost flow problem (in which there is merely one source $s$ and one sink $t$). Variants of the circulation problem are generalizations of all flow problems. That is, any flow problem can be viewed as a particular circulation problem.

== Usage ==
Routing and wavelength assignment (RWA) in optical burst switching of Optical Network would be approached via multi-commodity flow formulas, if the network is equipped with wavelength conversion at every node.

Register allocation can be modeled as an integer minimum cost multi-commodity flow problem: Values produced by instructions are source nodes, values consumed by instructions are sink nodes and registers as well as stack slots are edges.

== Solutions ==
In the decision version of problems, the problem of producing an integer flow satisfying all demands is NP-complete, even for only two commodities and unit capacities (making the problem strongly NP-complete in this case).

If fractional flows are allowed, the problem can be solved in polynomial time through linear programming, or through (typically much faster) fully polynomial time approximation schemes.

== Applications ==
Multicommodity flow is applied in the overlay routing in content delivery.

== External resources ==
- Papers by Clifford Stein about this problem: http://www.columbia.edu/~cs2035/papers/#mcf
- Software solving the problem: https://web.archive.org/web/20130306031532/http://typo.zib.de/opt-long_projects/Software/Mcf/
