= Transshipment =

Shipment of goods or containers to an intermediate destination

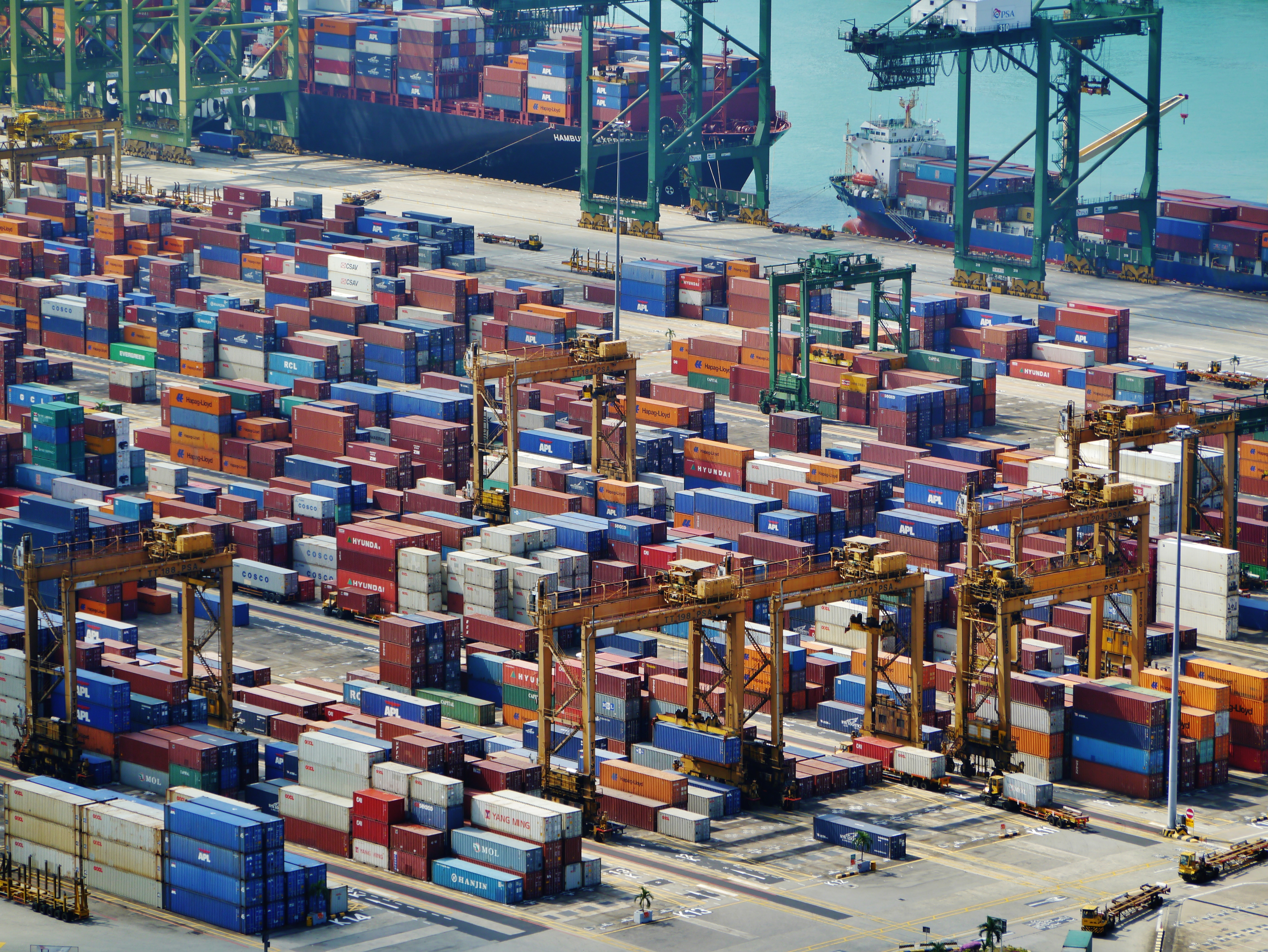
Port of Singapore is currently the largest transshipment port in the world.

Transshipment, trans-shipment or transhipment is the shipment of goods or containers to an intermediate destination, then to another destination.

One possible reason for transshipment is to change the means of transport during the journey (e.g., from ship transport to road transport), known as transloading. Another reason is to combine small shipments into a large shipment (consolidation), or the opposite: dividing a large shipment into smaller shipments (deconsolidation). Transshipment usually takes place in transport hubs. Much international transshipment also takes place in designated customs areas, thus avoiding the need for customs checks or duties, otherwise a major hindrance for efficient transport.

An item handled (from the shipper's point of view) as a single movement is not generally considered transshipped, even if it changes from one mode of transport to another at several points. Previously, it was often not distinguished from transloading, since each leg of such a trip was typically handled by a different shipper.

Transshipment is normally fully legal and an everyday part of world trade. However, it can also be a method used to disguise intent, as is the case with illegal logging, smuggling, or grey-market goods.

== Transshipment at container ports or terminals ==
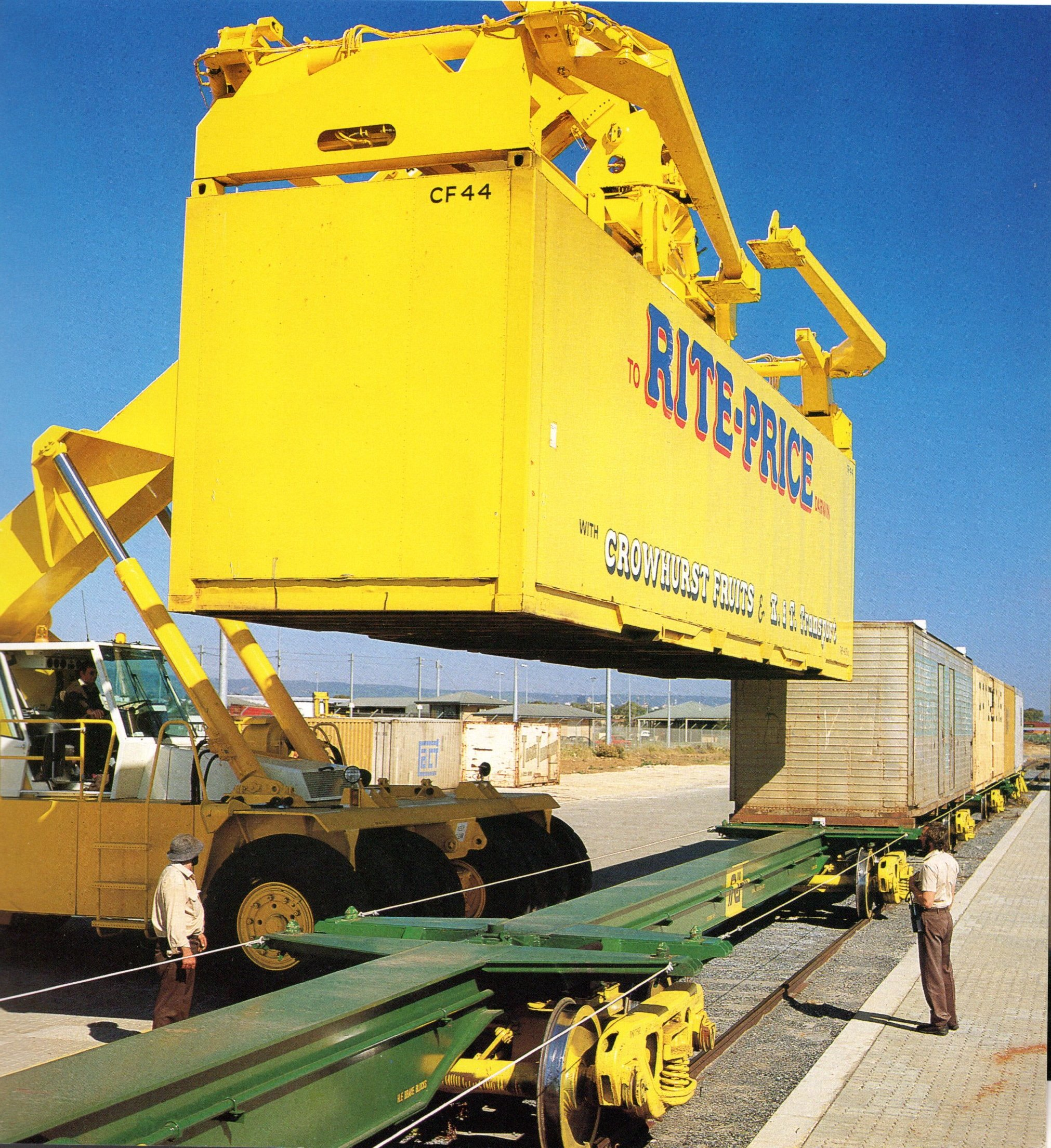
Mechanisation associated with standardised containers revolutionised rail, road and sea freight handling.

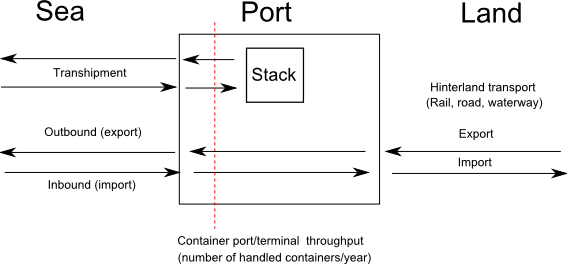
Scheme describing the possible container flows at a container port/terminal

The transshipment of containers at a container port or terminal can be defined as the number (or proportion) of containers, possibly expressed in TEU, of the total container flow that is handled at the port or terminal and, after temporary storage in the stack, transferred to another ship to reach their destinations. The exact definition of transshipment may differ between ports, mostly depending on the inclusion of inland water transport (barges operating on canals and rivers to the hinterland). The definition of transshipment may:

- include only seaborne transfers (a change to another international deep-sea container ship); or
- include both seaborne and inland waterway ship transfers (sometimes called water-to-water transshipment). Most coastal container ports in China have a large proportion of riverside "transshipment" to the hinterland.

In both cases, a single, unique, transshipped container is counted twice in the port performance, since it is handled twice by the waterside container cranes (separate unloading from arriving ship A, waiting in the stack, and loading onto departing ship B).

== Transshipment at sea ==
Transshipment at sea is done by transferring goods from one ship to another.

=== Fisheries ===
In global fisheries transshipment is used to transfer catch to refrigerated cargo vessels that also supply fishing vessels with fuel, food, equipment and personnel allowing them to stay at sea for months or even years. This guarantees that fish quickly find their way to the market without a decrease in quality.

Since transshipment at sea encounters often happen on the high seas, in regions with poor regulation and oversight, they are also used to disguise criminal activities such as illegal, unreported and unregulated fishing, forced labor, human trafficking and drug smuggling. Several states and regional fishery management organizations have therefore prohibited the practice for certain vessel types or issued a complete ban within their zone of jurisdiction.

=== Bulk products ===
Transshipment at sea also occurs in the export of bulk products. Choosing to transship reduces capital costs for port developers and can overcome problems arising from limited access to deep water. Loading barges typically specify 4 to 7 meters of draft. Since at least 2011, transshipment has been used in northern Australia in the export of bulk minerals including bauxite, iron ore and potash from mines in Queensland, Western Australia and the Northern Territory.

== Transshipment at a break-of-gauge ==
At a break-of-gauge, cargo is transloaded from boxcars or covered goods wagons on one track to wagons on another track of a different rail gauge, or else containers are transloaded from flatcars on one track to flatcars on another track of a different gauge.

== See also ==
- Cross-docking
- Customs area
- Entrepôt
- List of free ports
- Milk run
- Transshipment problem
