= Network flow =

Network flow may refer to:

- Network flow problem
- Flow network
- Traffic flow (computer networking)

== See also ==
- Flow (disambiguation)
