= D. R. Fulkerson =

American mathematician

Delbert Ray Fulkerson
- Born: August 14, 1924; Tamms, Illinois, US
- Died: January 10, 1976 (aged 51); Ithaca, New York, US
- Education: Southern Illinois University, University of Wisconsin–Madison
- Known for: Ford–Fulkerson algorithm
- Children: 2 sons
- Awards: Lester R. Ford Award (1967) of the Mathematical Association of America
- Scientific career
- Fields: Mathematics
- Workplaces: RAND Corporation, Cornell University
- Doctoral advisor: Cyrus MacDuffee
- Doctoral students: Robert G. Bland

Delbert Ray Fulkerson (/ˈfʌlkərsən/; August 14, 1924 – January 10, 1976) was an American mathematician who co-developed the Ford–Fulkerson algorithm, one of the best-known algorithms for solving the maximum flow problem in networks.

== Early life and education ==
D. R. Fulkerson was born in Tamms, Illinois, the third of six children of Elbert and Emma Fulkerson. Fulkerson became an undergraduate at Southern Illinois University. His academic career was interrupted by military service during World War II. Having returned to complete his degree after the war, he went on to do a Ph.D. in mathematics at the University of Wisconsin–Madison under the supervision of Cyrus MacDuffee, who was a student of L. E. Dickson. Fulkerson received his Ph.D. in 1951.

== Career ==
After graduation, Fulkerson joined the mathematics department at the RAND Corporation. In 1956, he and L. R. Ford Jr. described the Ford–Fulkerson algorithm. In 1962 they produced a book-length description of their method.

In 1971 he moved to Cornell University as the Maxwell Upson Professor of Engineering. He was diagnosed with Crohn's disease and was limited in his teaching. In despair, he committed suicide in 1976.

Fulkerson was the supervisor of Jon Folkman at RAND and Tatsuo Oyama at GRIPS. After Folkman committed suicide in 1969, Fulkerson blamed himself for failing to notice Folkman's suicidal behaviors.

In 1979, the Mathematical Programming Society and the American Mathematical Society established the Fulkerson Prize, which is now awarded every three years for outstanding papers in discrete mathematics.

== See also ==
- Out-of-kilter algorithm
- List of people diagnosed with Crohn's disease
