= Means of transport =

Any system used to transport goods

Means of transport are transport facilities used to carry people, animals, cargo, bulk material, other goods or items.

== Examples of means of transport ==
=== Space ===
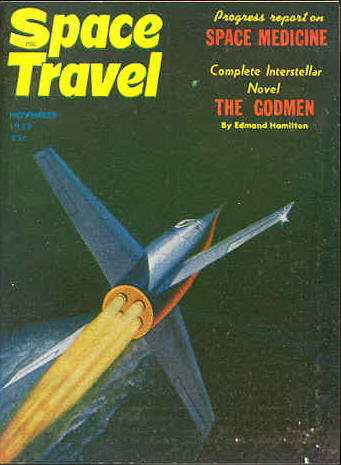
- space travel
  Spacecraft

=== Air ===
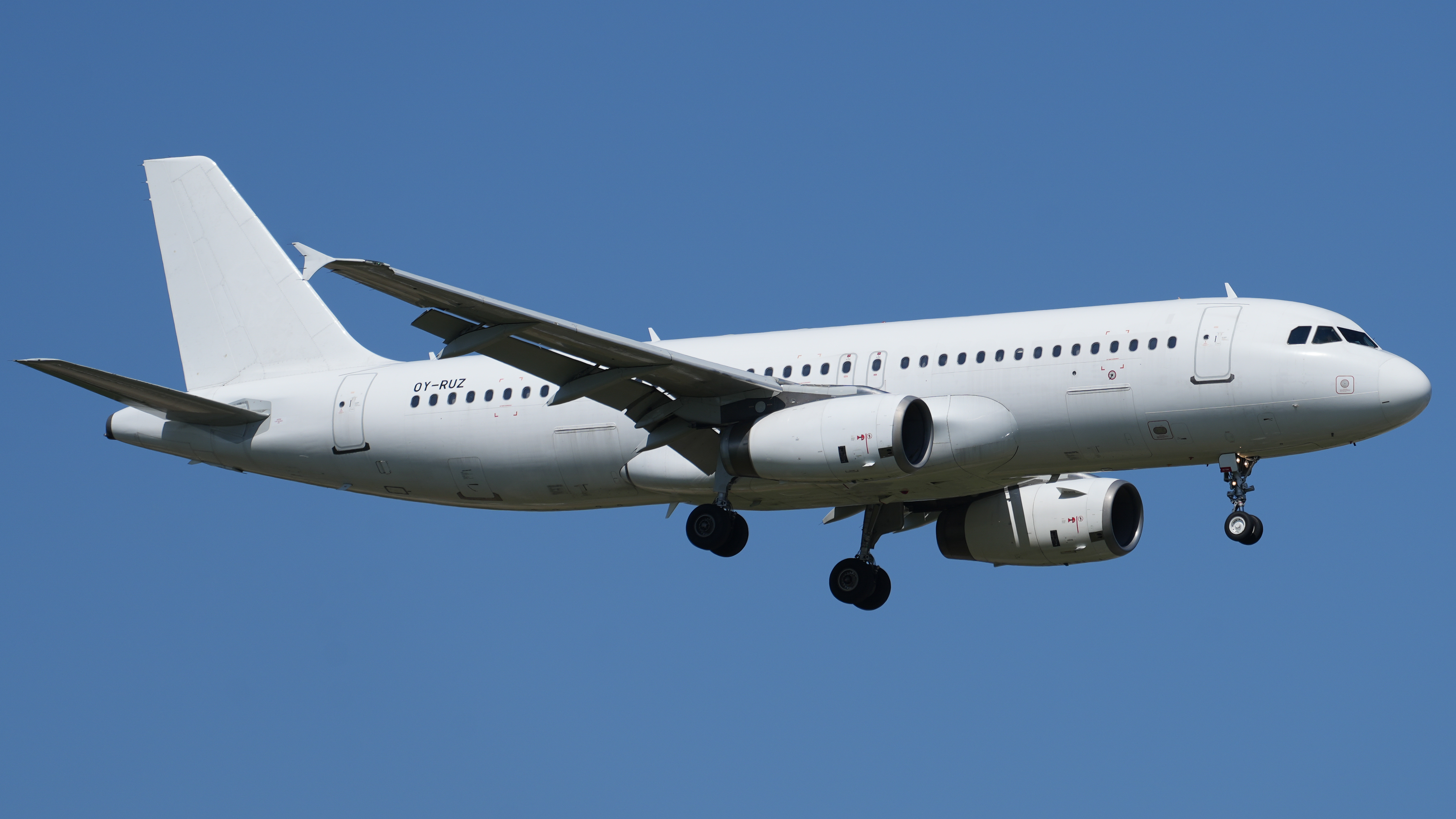
- transport in air
  Aircraft
- Drone

=== Water ===
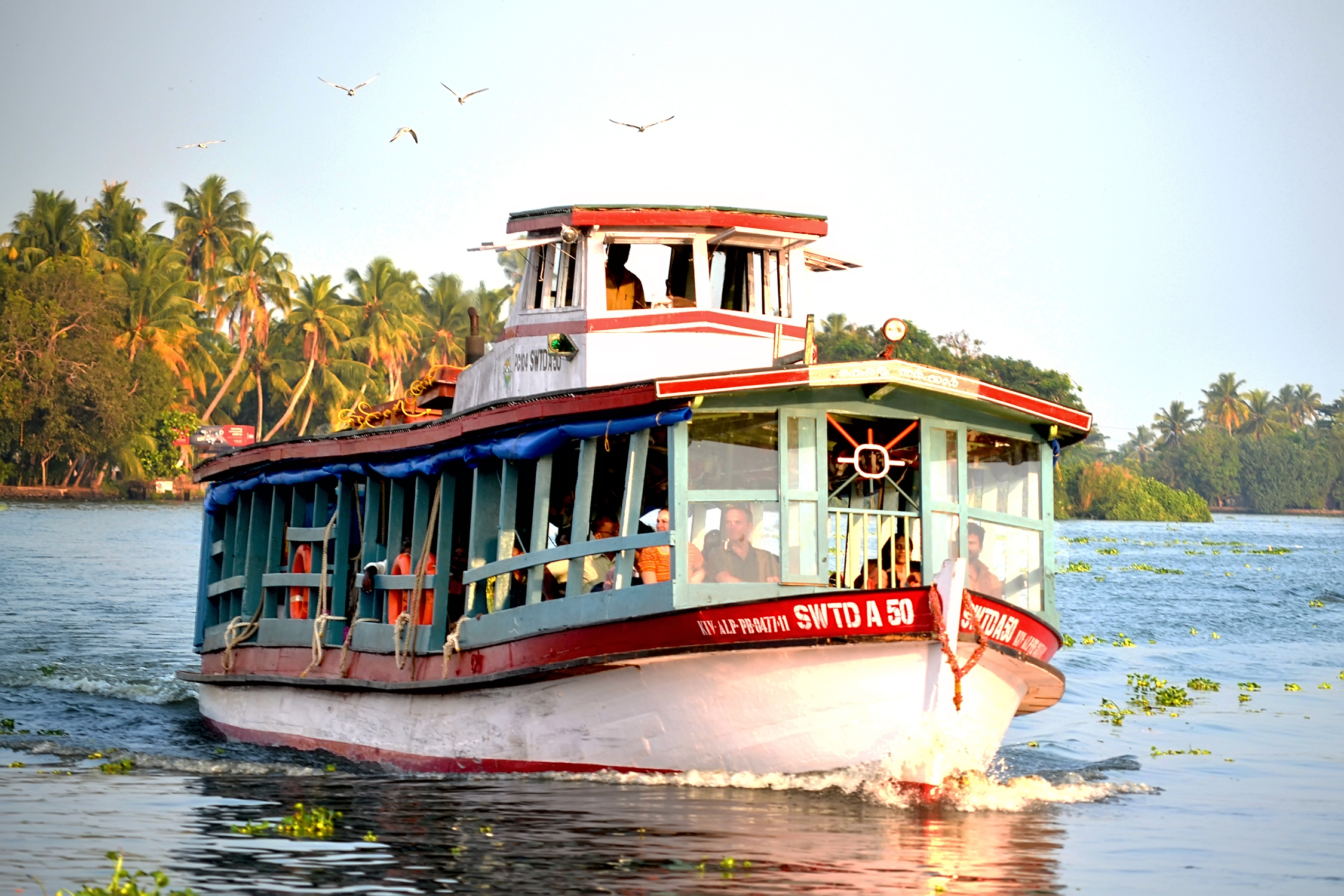
- transport on water

=== Land ===
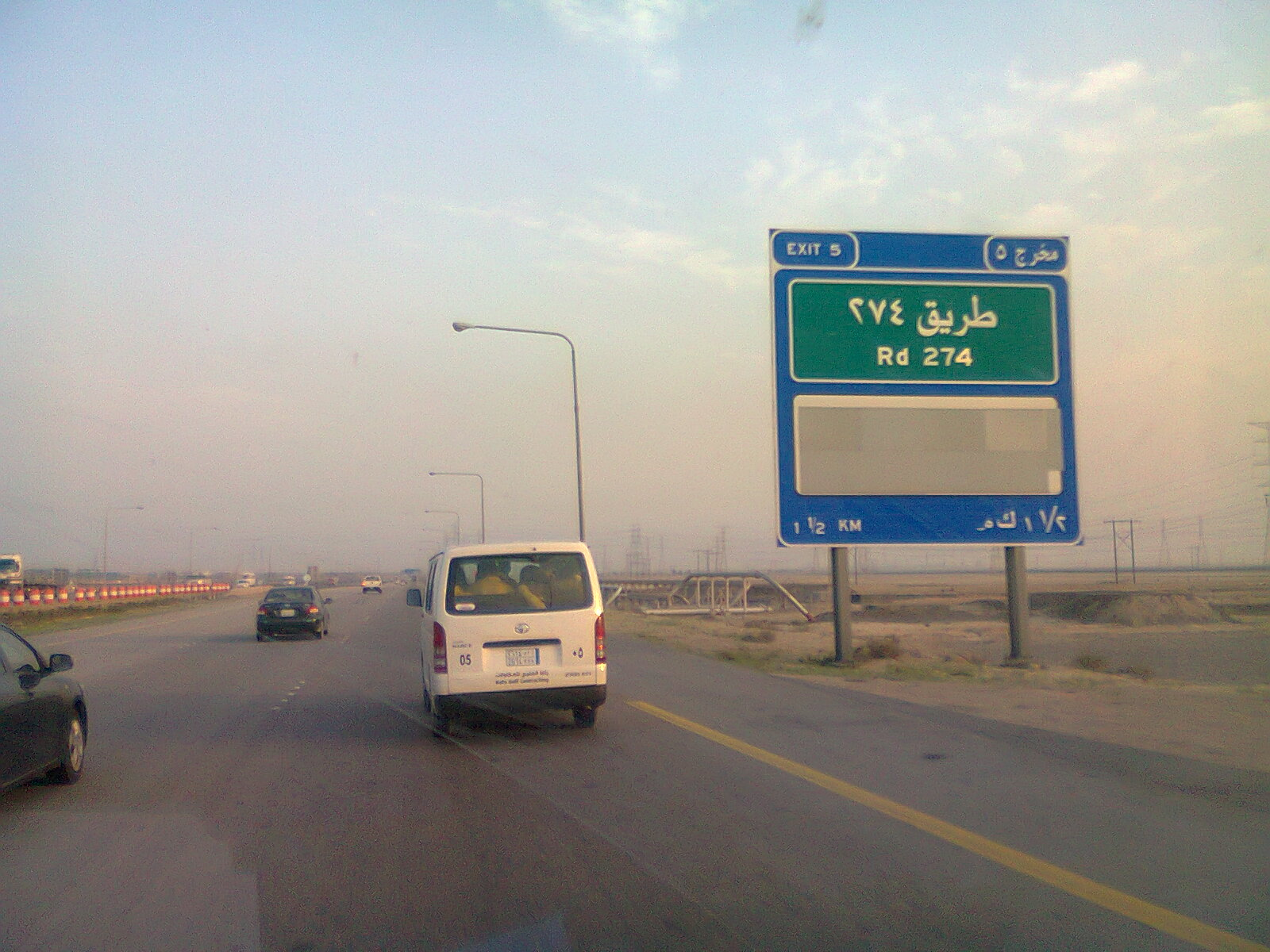
transport on land

ships

- Automobiles
- Bicycles
- Carriages
- Cycle rickshaws
- Human–electric hybrid vehicle
- Pack animals
- Personal rapid transit
- Riding animals
- Rickshaws
- Trains
- Trams
- Trucks
- Vehicles
- Velomobiles
- Wagons
- Ringway Transportations

=== Pipeline ===
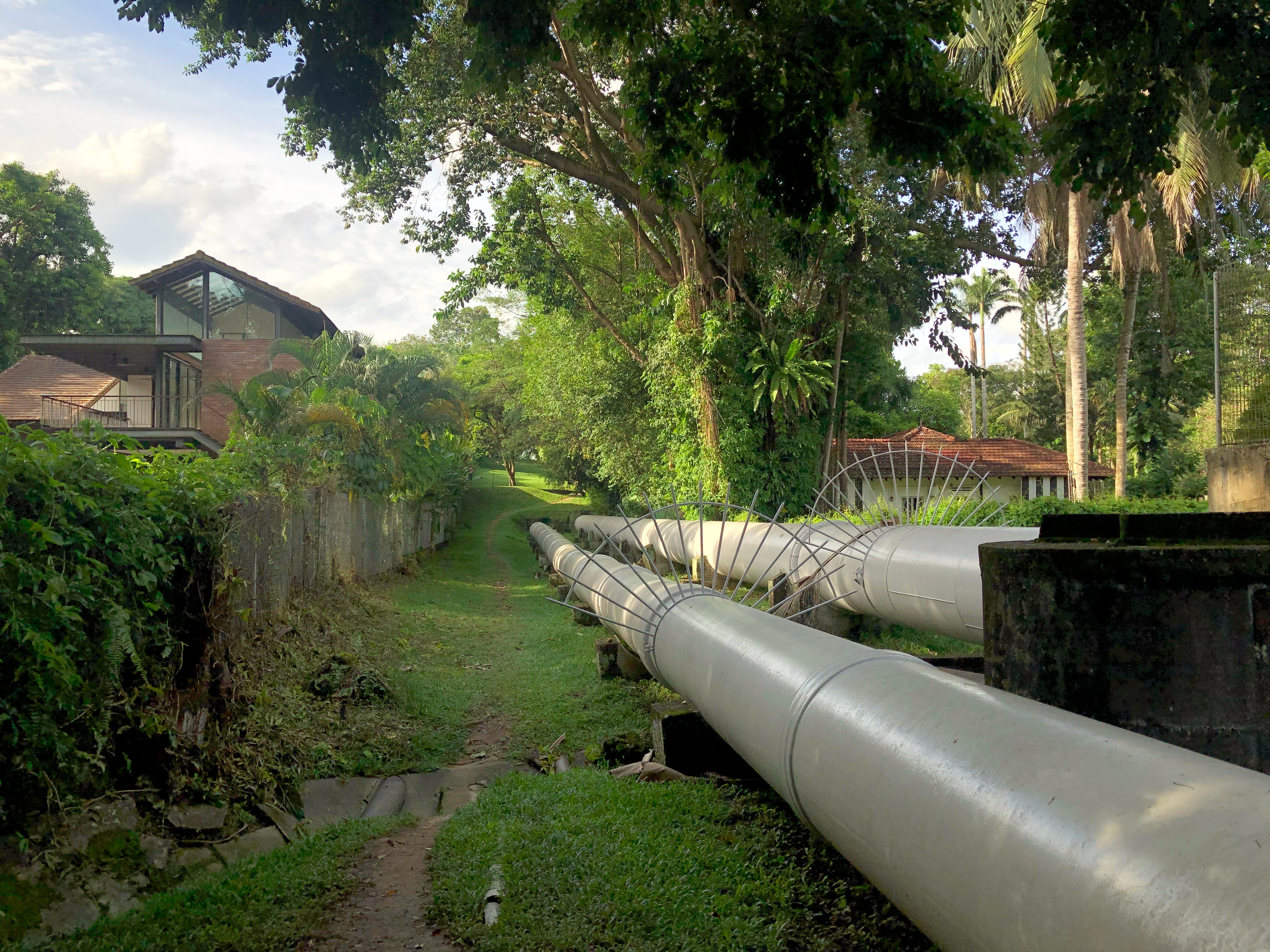
- pipe line
  Pipes
- Pneumatic tubes

== See also ==
- Transport § Means of transport
- Mode of transport
