= Satya Prakash (physicist) =

Indian physicist (born 1929)

- Born: 1 July 1929 (age 97); Najibabad, Uttar Pradesh, India
- Education: Allahabad University; National Research Council; California Institute of Technology
- Known for: Studies in Plasma physics
- Awards: Hari Om Ashram Prerit Senior Scientist Award (1975); Padma Shri (1982)
- Scientific career
- Fields: Plasma physics
- Workplaces: Physical Research Laboratory
- Doctoral advisor: Vikram Sarabhai
- Doctoral students: B.H.Subbaraya, S.P.Gupta, P Muralikrishna, C.L.Jain, H.S.S.Sinha, Rajesh Pandey, Surendra Pal

Satya Prakash (born 1 July 1929) is an Indian plasma physicist and a former senior professor at the Physical Research Laboratory. He is known for his studies on Langmuir probes and other contributions in space and plasma sciences. A protégé of Vikram Sarabhai, Satya Prakash is an elected fellow of all the three major Indian science academies such as Indian Academy of Sciences, Indian National Science Academy and National Academy of Sciences, India as well as the Gujarat Science Academy and is a recipient of the Hari Om Ashram Prerit Senior Scientist Award. The Government of India honored him with Padma Shri, the fourth highest Indian civilian award for his contributions to the discipline of Physics, in 1982.

== Biography ==
Satya Prakash was born on 1 July 1929, in Najibabad, Uttar Pradesh, India. He is a Physicist and has done pioneering work in the study of Solar time variation of Cosmic Ray Neutrons, the study of the equatorial ionospheric D, E and F region using space borne as well as ground based techniques. In recognition to these researches, he was awarded the First Hari Om Prerit Vikram Sarabhai award during 1975 and was decorated with Padma Shree award during 1982 by the President of India. In recognition he was elected as fellows of all the three important Indian Academies. He was elected as a Fellow of INSA during 1983. Later on he was also elected a fellow of Indian Academy of Sciences Bangalore, National Academy of Sciences, Allahabad, and Gujarat Science Academy. Satya Prakash earned his bachelor's degree and master's degree in Science from Allahabad University in 1951, joined Physical Research Laboratory (PRL) Ahmedabad and worked on Solar influence on the cosmic ray neutrons under the supervision of Prof. Vikram Sarabhai. For his studies, which was during the International Geophysical year he developed and established neutron piles at Kodaikanal and Gulmarg to measure cosmic ray produced neutrons. For the neutron counters used in the pile, he developed an all cooper metal system for purification of highly corrosive BF3 gas used in the counters. After his Ph D degree from Gujarat University, he continued his cosmic ray studies at National Research Council Canada as a Post- Doctoral fellow with Prof. I. B. Mc. Diarmid during 1958–60 and worked on the development of cosmic ray neutron detectors at California Institute of Technology as Post- Doctoral fellow with Prof. H.V. Neher during 1960–62. At PRL during 1962, he developed a group for in-situ studies of the upper atmospheric plasmas, plasma density irregularities and associated instability mechanisms, fields, and currents in the Equatorial Electrojet (EEJ), E and F region of the ionosphere. He indigenously developed a modified Langmuir probe and other supporting payloads that enabled him to carry out pioneering in-situ measurement of the plasma density irregularities in the EEJ leading to the identification of various plasma processes. Rocket borne payloads of Resonance probe, Electric field probe and Lyman Alpha detector with many special features were developed and used to carry out various studies. Ultraviolet monochromator and light sources were developed for the calibration of UV detectors. Payloads for the study of the energetic electrons were developed and flown on the first Indian Satellite Aryabhata. VHF radar operating at 50 MHz was developed and established at Thumba for structure and dynamics of the EEJ. Theoretical studies of the gravity wave wind generated electron density irregularities in the D, E and F region, electric field in the E region and their transmission to the F region via the geomagnetic field lines. He guided several research scholars and had many scientific publications in reputed journals.

== Other contributions ==
The VHF Radar developed by him at Vikram Sarabhai Space Centre, Thumba has now grown into a powerful system and is being used for the study of the EEJ and the F region dynamics. The vacuum ultraviolet monochromator, light sources, and other associated techniques development by him lead to the development of Laboratory Astrophysics group at Physical Research Laboratory (PRL). On the initiation Prof. Sarabhai and Prof. Dhawan Indian Institute of Science, he initiated jointly with Prof. Predhiman Krishan Kaw a plasma simulation experimental program of the EEJ associated plasma density irregularities at Physical Research Laboratory. This activity later developed into the Institute of plasma research in Gandhinagar.

== Family ==
Satya Prakash was married to Sushila Mittal, and they have three children.

== Awards ==
The Indian Academy of Sciences elected Satya Prakash as an elected fellow in 1974 and later, he was elected as a fellow by the National Academy of Sciences, India and the Indian National Science Academy (1983). A fellow of the Gujarat Science Academy, Satya Prakash received the Hari Om Ashram Prerit Senior Scientist Award in 1975.The Government of India included him in the Republic Day honors list in 1982 for the fourth highest civilian award of the Padma Shri, for his contributions in the field of Physics.

== Selected publications ==
- Neher, H.V.; Prakash, Satya (1957). "Metal system for chemical reactions and for studying properties of gases and liquids". Review of Scientific Instruments. 28 (4): 267. Bibcode:1957RScI...28..267N. doi:10.1063/1.1715855.
- Sarabhai, V. and S. Prakash, Variation of intensity and anisotropy of cosmic ray measured at the geomagnetic equator, Pro. Ind. Acad. Sci., LI, 84-116 (1960)
- Prakash, S. and B.H.Subbaraya, Langmuir probe for the measurement of electron density and electron temperature in the ionosphere, The Review of Sci. Instr. 38, 1132 (1967)
- Prakash, S., B.H.Subbaraya and S.P.Gupta, A study of equatorial E region during evening twilight using Langmuir Probe, J. Atmos. and Terr. Phys., 30, 1193 -1202 (1968)
- Prakash, Satya; Gupta, S. P.; Subbaraya, B. H. (September 1969). "Irregularities in the Equatorial E Region Over Thumba". Radio Science. 4 (9): 791–796. Bibcode:1969RaSc....4..791P. doi:10.1029/RS004i009p00791.
- Prakash S., S.P.Gupta and B.H.Subbaraya, A study of irregularities in the nighttime equatorial E region using a Langmuir Probe and Plasma Noise Probe, Planet Space Sci. 18, 1307-1318 (1970)
- Prakash S., B.H.Subbaraya, S.P.Gupta, Investigation of the daytime lower ionosphere over the equator using Langmuir Probe and plasma noise probe, Jour. Atmos. Terr. Phys. 33, 129-135 (1971)
- Subbaraya B.H., S. Prakash and S.P.Gupta, Night time E-region at Thumba, Indian Journal of pure and applied Phy. 9, 8, 626-630 (1971)
- Prakash S., B.H. Subbaraya & S.P.Gupta, Rocket measurement of ionospheric irregularities in the equatorial ionosphere at Thumba and identification of plasma irregularities, Indian J. of Radio & Space Phys., 34, 72-80 (1972).
- Subbaraya, B.H., Muralikrishna, P., Sastry, T.S.G. and Prakash, S., A study of the structure of electrical conductivities and the electrostatic field within the equatorial electrojet. Planet. Space Sci., 20, 47–52, (1972)
- Subbaraya, B.H., S. Prakash and P.N.Pareek, Molecular oxygen concentration in the equatorial mesosphere, Jour. Atmos. Terr. Phys., 34, 1141-1144 (1972)
- Height variation of the electron density and irregularity amplitudes measured at Thumba, India, around noon and midnight. [Adopted from Prakash et al. 1972].refer page 161, https://www.sciencedirect.com/book/9780124040137/the-earths-ionosphere, Kelly Book 'The earth's Ionosphere, by Michael C. Kelley. Cornell University, Ithaca, New York.
- Prakash S., B.H.Subbaraya, S.P.Gupta, Some features of equatorial D region as revealed from the Langmuir probe experiments, Space Research, XIV, 259-265(1974)
- Prakash, S.; Jain, C. L.; Balsley, B. B.; Greenwald, R. A. (1 October 1974). "Evidence of two types of electron density irregularities in the electrojet over Thumba, India". Journal of Geophysical Research. 79 (28): 4334–4336. Bibcode:1974JGR....79.4334P. doi:10.1029/JA079i028p04334.
- Subbaraya, B.H., S. Prakash, S.P. Gupta and H.S.S. Sinha, Measurement of electron temperatures in the lower ionosphere by detecting the space potential on the Langmuir probe characteristics, Planet. and Space Sci. 22, 180–181, (1974).
- Prakash, S.; Muralikrisha, P. (1976). "The nature of electric field in E-Region close to morning and evening reversals". Geophysical Research Letters. 3 (8): 445–447. Bibcode:1976GeoRL...3..445P. doi:10.1029/GL003i008p00445.
- Rao T.R. and S. Prakash, Electron plasma resonances detected by a mutual admittance probe in equatorial ionosphere. Space Research, XVIII, 281–284, (1978)
- Prakash S., B. H. Subbaraya, Vijay Kumar, P.N. Pareek, J.S. Shirke, R.N. Misra, K.K. Goswami, R.S. Singh and A. Banerjee, The Aeronomy experiment of Aryabhatta, Proc. Indi. Acad. Sci., 321-329 (1978)
- Muralikrishna, P. and S. Prakash, Height shift in the radar echoes from the E-region around the morning and evening reversals, J. Geomag. Geoelect., 30, 125–129, (1978)
- Prakash S., R. Pandey, Interaction of gravity waves with the ionospheric plasma and the production of electric fields and currents, Proc. Indian Acad. Sci. 88A, 229-245 (1979)
- Prakash S. and R. Pandey, Formation of electron density layers in the equatorial E region, Adv. in Space Exploration, 8, 83-86 (1980)
- Subbaraya B.H., Shyam Lal and S. Prakash, Low latitude mesospheric molecular oxygen profiles from Lyman alpha absorption measurement from Thumba. Space Research, XX, 75- 78 (1980)
- Prakash S., S.P.Gupta and B.H.Subbaraya, and R. Pandey, A review of the electron density irregularities in the equatorial D and E-region, Adv. in Space Exploration, 8, 3-16 (1980)
- Prakash, S.; Muralikrishna, P. (1981). "E and F region electric fields over dip equator". Journal of Geophysical Research. 86 (A4): 2095. Bibcode:1981JGR....86.2095P. doi:10.1029/JA086iA04p02095. ISSN 0148-0227.
- Subbaraya, B.H., P. Muralikrishna, S. Prakash, P.V. Kulkarni, M. Herse, and G. Moreels, A Spacelab experiment for the study of gravity waves in the mesosphere, Handbook for MAP Vol. 2, ed. S.K. Avery, 483–489, (1981)
- Muralikrishna, P., S. Prakash, and B.H. Subbaraya, Digital Processing of Spacelab Imagery, Adv. Space Res., 2., 107–110, (1983)
- Prakash S., S. Pal and R. Pandey, Electric field and electron density measurements in the equatorial E-region, Adv. Space Res, 2, 10, 93-96 (1983)
- Prakash S., S. Pal, R. Pandey and B.H. Subbaraya, In situ studies of electron density during equatorial Spread-F, Adv. Space Res, 2, 10, 195-197(1983)
- Pal S., S. Prakash, Y.B. Acharya, R.N.Misra, A payload for the study of electric fields and electron density in the equatorial region. Adv. Space Res. 2, 7, 57-59 (1983)
- Subbaraya B.H., S. Prakash and S.P.Gupta, Electron density in the equatorial lower ionosphere from the Langmuir probe experiments conducted at Thumba during 1966 -1978, Scientific report No. ISRO-PRL-SR-15-83 of Indian Space research organization Banglore (1983)
- Prakash S., and R. Pandey, Rocket borne studies of electron density irregularities in the equatorial D and F region, Proc. Indian Acad. Sci. Earth and Planet Sci., 93, 283-308(1984)
- Prakash S., and R. Pandey, Generation of electric fields due to the gravity waves and their transmission to other ionospheric regions, Jour. Atmos. Terr. Phys., 47, 363-374 (1985)
- Prakash S. and S. Pal, Electric field and electron density irregularities in the equatorial electrojet, J. Atmos. Terrs. Phys., 47, 853-866 (1985)
- Subbaraya B.H., S. Prakash and S.P. Gupta, Structure of equatorial lower ionosphere from the Thumba Langmuir Probe Experiments, Adv. Space Res., 5, 35-38 (1985).
- Sinha H.S.S. and S. Prakash, Rocket observations of E-region ionization irregularities produced through cross-field instability mechanism - current status, Ind. J. Radio. and Space Phys., 16, 102–113, (1987).
- Pandey R., S. Prakash and H.S.S. Sinha, Formation of Blanketing Es-layers during daytime counter electrojet over magnetic equator, J. Atmos. Terr. Phys. 54, 63–74, (1992).
- Chandra H., G.D. Vyas, H.S.S. Sinha, R.N. Misra and S. Prakash, Ionospheric Scintillations Observations from SHAR, J. Atmos. Terr. Phys. 54, 167–172, (1992)
- Sinha, H. S. S.; Prakash, Satya (1995). "Electron densities in the equatorial lower ionosphere over Thumba and SHAR" (PDF). Indian Journal of Radio and Space Physics. 24: 184–192.
- Chandra, H.; Vyas, G.D.; Sinha, H.S.S.; S., Prakash; R.N., Misra (1997). "Equatorial Spread-F campaign over SHAR". Journal of Atmospheric and Solar-Terrestrial Physics. 59 (2): 191–205. Bibcode:1997JASTP..59..191C. doi:10.1016/1364-6826(95)00199-9.
- Prakash, Satya (1999). "Production of electric field perturbations by gravity wave winds in the E region suitable for initiating equatorial spread F". Journal of Geophysical Research: Space Physics. 104 (A5): 10051–10069. Bibcode:1999JGR...10410051P. doi:10.1029/1999JA900028.
- Prakash, S.; Pallamraju, D.; Sinha, H. S. S. (2009). "Role of the equatorial ionization Anomaly in the development of the Evening Pre-Reversal Enhancement of the Equatorial Zonal Electric Field". Journal of Geophysical Research: Space Physics. 114 (A2): n/a. Bibcode:2009JGRA..114.2301P. doi:10.1029/2007JA012808.
