= Journal of the ACM =

- Discipline: Computer science
- Language: English
- Edited by: Venkatesan Guruswami

Publication details
- History: 1954–present
- Publisher: ACM (United States)
- Frequency: Bimonthly
- Open access: Hybrid
- Impact factor: 2.5 (2024)

Standard abbreviations
- ISO 4: J. ACM

Indexing
- ISSN: 0004-5411 (print); 1557-735X (web)
- OCLC no.: 783892264

Links
- Journal homepage; Online access; Online archive

The Journal of the ACM (JACM) is a peer-reviewed scientific journal covering computer science in general, especially theoretical aspects. It is an official journal of the Association for Computing Machinery. Its current editor-in-chief is Venkatesan Guruswami.

The journal was established in 1954 and "computer scientists universally hold the Journal of the ACM in high esteem".

== See also ==
- Communications of the ACM
