= Graph cut =

Graph cut may refer to:

- Cut (graph theory), in mathematics
- Graph cut optimization
- Graph cuts in computer vision
