= Grating light valve =

Micro projection technology

The grating light valve (GLV) is a "micro projection" technology that operates using a dynamically adjustable diffraction grating. It competes with other light valve technologies such as Digital Light Processing (DLP) and liquid crystal on silicon (LCoS) for implementation in video projector devices such as rear-projection televisions. The use of microelectromechanical systems (MEMS) in optical applications, which is known as optical MEMS or micro-opto-electro-mechanical structures (MOEMS), has enabled the possibility to combine the mechanical, electrical, and optical components in tiny-scale.

Silicon Light Machines (SLM), in Sunnyvale CA, markets and licenses GLV technology with the capitalised trademarks "'Grated Light Valve'" and GLV, previously Grating Light Valve. The valve diffracts laser light using an array of tiny movable ribbons mounted on a silicon base. The GLV uses six ribbons as each pixel's diffraction gratings. Electronic signals alter the alignment of the gratings, and this displacement controls the intensity of the diffracted light in a very smooth gradation.

== Brief history ==
The light valve was initially developed at Stanford University, in California, by electrical engineering professor David M. Bloom, along with William C. Banyai, Raj Apte, Francisco Sandejas, and Olav Solgaard, professor in the Stanford Department of Electrical Engineering. In 1994, the start-up company Silicon Light Machines was founded by Bloom to develop and commercialize the technology. Cypress Semiconductor acquired Silicon Light Machines in 2000 and sold the company to Dainippon Screen. Before the acquisition by Dainippon Screen, several marketing articles were published in EETimes, EETimes China, EETimes Taiwan, Electronica Olgi, and Fibre Systems Europe, highlighting Cypress Semiconductor's new MEMS manufacturing capabilities. The company is now wholly owned by Dainippon Screen Manufacturing Co., Ltd.

In July 2000, Sony announced the signing of a technology licensing agreement with SLM for the implementation of GLV technology in laser projectors for large venues, but by 2004 Sony announced the SRX-R110 front projector using its LCoS-based technology SXRD. SLM then partnered with Evans & Sutherland (E&S). Using GLV technology, E&S developed the E&S Laser Projector, designed for use in domes and planetariums. The E&S Laser Projector was incorporated into the Digistar 3 dome projection system.

== Technology ==
The GLV device is built on a silicon wafer and consists of parallel rows of "'highly reflective micro-ribbons'" – ribbons of sizes of a few μm with a top layer of aluminium – suspended above an air gap that is configured such that alternate ribbons (active ribbons are interlaced with static ribbons) can be dynamically actuated. Individual electrical connections to each active ribbon electrode provide for independent actuation. The ribbons and the substrate are electrically conductive so that the deflection of the ribbon can be controlled in an analog manner: When the voltage of the active ribbons is set to ground potential, all ribbons are undeflected, and the device acts as a mirror so the incident light returns along the same path. When a voltage is applied between the ribbon and base conductor, an electrical field is generated and deflects the active ribbon downward toward the substrate. This deflection can be as big as one-quarter wavelength hence creating diffraction effects on incident light that is reflected at an angle that is different from that of the incident light. The wavelength to diffract is determined by the spatial frequency of the ribbons. As this spatial frequency is determined by the photolithographic mask used to form the GLV device in the CMOS fabrication process, the departure angles can be very accurately controlled, which is useful for optical switching applications.

Switching from undeflected to maximum ribbon deflection can occur in 20 nanoseconds, which is a million times faster than conventional LCD devices and about 1000 times faster than TI's DMD technology. This high speed can be achieved thanks to the small size, small mass, and small excursion (of a few hundreds of nanometers) of the ribbons. Besides, there is no physical contact between moving elements which makes the lifetime of the GLV as long as 15 years without stopping (over 210 billion switching cycles).

== Applications ==
The GLV technology has been applied to various products, from laser-based HDTV sets to computer-to-plate offset printing presses to DWDM components used for wavelength management. Applications of the GLV device in maskless photolithography have also been extensively investigated.

=== Displays ===
To build a display system using the GLV device, different approaches can be followed: ranging from a simple process using a single GLV device with white light as a source, thus having a monochrome system, to a more complex solution using three different GLV devices each for one of the RGB primaries' sources that once diffracted require additional optical filters to point the light onto the screen or an intermediate using a single white source with a GLV device. Besides, the light can be diffracted by the GLV device into an eyepiece for virtual retinal display or into an optical system for image projection onto a screen (projector and rear-projector).

== See also ==
- DLP
- Liquid crystal on silicon
