= Electromanipulation =

Electromanipulation is a micro-material analyzing method mostly used for manipulations of biological cells that uses properties of diverse electric fields. In nanotechnology, nanomaterials are so small that they can hardly be directly mechanically manipulated. Hence, electric fields are applied to them to make field-induced movements or deformations. It is a recently developed technology and is still in progress of widening applications. Types of Electronmanipulation includes dielectrophoresis, electro-rotation, electro-deformation, electro-disruption, electro-destruction, electroporation, and electro-fusion. Diverse electromanipulations are achieved using various electric fields including AC(alternating current), DC(direct current), and pulsed(deliver high-energy discharges at very short periods) electrical fields. Electromanipulation of cells permits diverse cell manipulations with minimal mechanical contact between cells and device structures. Although predominantly used in cells, electromanipulation also contributes to other scientific fields such as Hybridoma technology and nanoelectronic device development.

== Types of Electromanipulation ==
There are seven types of electromanipulation, some are drastically different in purpose and function while some are closely related. The most developed and common type is dielectrophoresis. Various manipulations of micro-materials can be achieved using one or several of the seven electromanipulation. Distinct types sometimes require various electric fields or conditions.

=== Dielectrophoresis (DEP) ===
Electric field applied: DC or AC oscillating (most cases)

Purpose: displacement

Condition: suspension media of low electrical conductivity; spatially non-uniform electric field

Theory: DEP force is produced by differential polarizability of cells and their suspending medium. There are two types of DEP force, positive DEP (pDEP) and negative DEP (nDEP). pDEP points towards strong regions of the nonuniform electric field while nDEP points towards weak regions of the nonuniform electric field. Live cells can quickly be attracted to the electrode edge when applying DEP, thus separating live cells and dead cells. Dielectric properties of cells can be analyzed using measurements of DEP spectra of cells.

=== Electro-rotation (ER) ===
Electric field applied: AC oscillating

Purpose: rotation

Condition: suspension media of low electrical conductivity; frequency is approximately the crossover frequency(DEP force is negligible)

Theory: ER changes the alignment of non-spherical cells by changing the frequency of the oscillating electric field.

=== Electro-deformation (ED) ===
Electric field applied: AC oscillating

Purpose: deformation; compare viscoelastic and power-law properties of cells

Condition: suspension media of low electrical conductivity

Theory: ED controls and deforms cells that being attracted to the edge of the electrode edge(by DEP) by increasing AC potential

=== Electro-disruption ===
Electric field applied: pulsed

Purpose: disruption of subcellular structures

Condition: non-uniform electric field

Theory: ED performs electromanipulation inside a cell which has compromised cytoskeletons and a detached nuclei. Deradated cells eject cytosolic contents and become "ghosts"(about 1.5 times the normal cell size). Ghosts can be deflected by pulsed fields and inflected by ac fields.

=== Electro-destruction (lysis) ===
Electric field applied: pulsed

Purpose: lysis (the disintegration of a cell by rupture of the cell wall or membrane.)

Condition: non-uniform electric field

Theory: pDEP is used to increase the occurrence of lysis, and nDEP is used to decrease the occurrence of lysis. Conditions of cell lysis can be studied by switching pulsing amplitudes.

=== Electro-poration (EP) and Electro-fusion (EF) ===
Electric field applied: pulsed

Purpose: Cell-membrane disruption

Condition: non-uniform electric field; dielectrophoretic alignment of cells

Theory: Cell membrane disruption can be achieved by switching amplitude, duration, pulses rate and number of pulses of the pulsed electric field. When cells' membranes are disrupted, some cells merge into one big cell which can be 3-4 times the size of a normal cell. There are two types of EP: One is irreversible EP which can lead to cytolysis(the bursting of cell membrane when excess water is in the cell); the other is reversible EP which helps maintain cells’ vitality while transforming molecules into cells.

== Development ==
In the early part of 20th century, discoveries of irreversible membrane breakdown and dielectrophoresis are made. Those discoveries serve as fundamental ideas of cellular electromanipulation. In late 20th century, cellular electromanipulation techniques was developed based on the discovery of later discovered reversible membrane breakdown.

== Devices ==
Devices for various kinds of electromanipulation are constantly updating, some of newly invented EM devices are introduced in this section. Each device is dedicated to perform a unique kind of electromanipulation.

=== Multilayer Micro-electrode Structure ===
This multilayer micro-electrode structure is designed for selective manipulation and separation of bioparticles using traveling field dielectrophoresis.

==== Purpose ====
Multilayer micro-electrode structure enables bioparticles to move in a stationary supporting fluid which lead to stationary separations of viable and nonviable yeast cells. It can also achieve transportation of bioparticles in suspended mixtures. It also plays an important role as an integral component contributing to the "biofactory on a chip" technology.

==== Structure ====
It contains a base portion and a top portion. Each contains one layer of electrodes. The base part consists(from bottom to top):

1. One layer of glass
2. One thin layer of chromium
3. A 0.1μm layer of gold
4. Base electrode structure

After the base portion, an insulating layer is applied. On top of the insulating layer is the top part which consists(from bottom to top):

1. Top electrode structure
2. Another layer of 0.1μm chromium
3. Another layer of 0.1μm gold

It also contains four electrical busbars to energize traveling field electrode arrays. Electrodes on each side of a channel are aligned with windows between electrodes on the opposite side. Opposing electrodes on each side of a channel were designed to be offset from each other.

==== Advantages Compare to Old Devices ====
1. Minimize voltage usage and heat loss.
2. Perform particle selection on very small sample.
3. Act as building blocks in other technologies like bioprocessors or biofactory chips.

=== Electroporation Device ===
An improved device to conduct electroporation was invented by Andrew M. Hoff, Richard Gilbert, Richard Heller, Mark J. Jaroszeski from University of South Florida in 2010.

==== Purpose ====
This device is dedicated to deliver a molecule into a tissue using electroporation.

==== Advantages Compare to Old Devices ====
1. Has a much smaller scale
2. Has a lower risk of damage cell; low activation energy and minimize tissue damage and patient discomfort
3. Has lower applied power, voltage
4. Deal with multiple target tissues at the same time
5. Includes a reservoir of chemical species

== Other Applications of Electromanipulation ==
=== Electromanipulation of Spin Crossover Nanorods ===
Spin Crossover complexes are formed by transition metal ions. They can switch between high spin and low spin which leads to changes of magnetic, optical, mechanical properties and more. Dielectrophoresis (DEP) is used to perform molecular spin-state switching. It organizes nano-objects between the electrodes. DEP force aligns the SCO nanorods with the direction of electric field applied. Electromanipulation of spin crossover nanorods is a new field of electromanipulation that are possible building block techniques for nano electronic devices.

=== Electromanipulation of Droplets for Microfluidic Applications ===
Electromanipulation of droplets refers to using electric fields to move or shape small quantities of liquids. When applying a low frequency AC electric field to a high conductive liquid droplet inside a parallel capacitor, the droplet deforms into a new shape. By conducting numerous experiments, an equation which describes the deformation of liquid drop can be summarized.
