= Olav Solgaard =

Norwegian-American electrical engineer

- Education: Norwegian Institute of Technology, Stanford University
- Scientific career
- Fields: Photonics
- Workplaces: University of California, Davis; Stanford University
- Thesis: Integrated semiconductor light modulators for fiber optic and display applications (1992)
- Doctoral advisor: David M. Bloom

Olav Solgaard is a Professor in the Stanford Department of Electrical Engineering. He was the Director of the Ginzton Lab from 2008 until 2014.

== Education ==
Olav Solgaard completed a B. S. Electrical Engineering, from the Norwegian Institute of Technology, Norway in 1981. He completed degrees in Electrical Engineering from Stanford University in 1987 (MS) and 1992 (PhD).

Prior to joining Stanford’s Department of Electrical Engineering in 1999, Olav was a faculty member at the University of California, Davis. His work at UC Davis led to the invention of the multi-wavelength, fiber-optical switch.

== Research ==
Solgaard's research is in the areas of semiconductor fabrication techniques; specifically, microfabrication and integration of optical devices and systems.

As of 2019, Olav Solgaard has been issued more than 70 patents.

== Awards and honors ==
- 2008 - Fellow of the Optical Society of America
- 2008 - Member of the Royal Norwegian Society of Sciences and Letters
- 2010 - Fellow of the Norwegian Academy of Technological Sciences
- 2017 - Fellow of the IEEE

== See also ==
- Grating light valve
