= Iterated conditional modes =

In statistics, iterated conditional modes is a deterministic algorithm for obtaining a configuration of a local maximum of the joint probability of a Markov random field. It does this by iteratively maximizing the probability of each variable conditioned on the rest.

== See also ==
- Belief propagation
- Graph cuts in computer vision
- Optimization problem
