= Pseudo-Boolean function =

Generalization of binary functions

In mathematics and optimization, a pseudo-Boolean function is a function of the form

$$f: \mathbf{B}^n \to \R,$$

where B = {0, 1} is a Boolean domain and n is a nonnegative integer called the arity of the function. A Boolean function is then a special case, where the values are also restricted to 0 or 1.

== Representations ==
Any pseudo-Boolean function can be written uniquely as a multi-linear polynomial:

$$f(\boldsymbol{x}) = a + \sum_i a_ix_i + \sum_{i<j}a_{ij}x_ix_j + \sum_{i<j<k}a_{ijk}x_ix_jx_k + \ldots$$

The degree of the pseudo-Boolean function is simply the degree of the polynomial in this representation.

In many settings (e.g., in Fourier analysis of pseudo-Boolean functions), a pseudo-Boolean function is viewed as a function $f$ that maps $\{-1,1\}^n$ to $\mathbb{R}$. Again in this case we can uniquely write $f$ as a multi-linear polynomial: $f(x)= \sum_{I\subseteq [n]}\hat{f}(I)\prod_{i\in I}x_i,$ where $\hat{f}(I)$ are Fourier coefficients of $f$ and $[n]=\{1,...,n\}$.

== Optimization ==
Minimizing (or, equivalently, maximizing) a pseudo-Boolean function is NP-hard. This can easily be seen by formulating, for example, the maximum cut problem as maximizing a pseudo-Boolean function.

=== Submodularity ===
The submodular set functions can be viewed as a special class of pseudo-Boolean functions, which is equivalent to the condition

$$f(\boldsymbol{x}) + f(\boldsymbol{y}) \ge f(\boldsymbol{x} \wedge \boldsymbol{y}) + f(\boldsymbol{x} \vee \boldsymbol{y}), \; \forall \boldsymbol{x}, \boldsymbol{y}\in \mathbf{B}^n\,.$$

This is an important class of pseudo-boolean functions, because they can be minimized in polynomial time. Note that minimization of a submodular function is a polynomially solvable problem independent on the presentation form, for e.g. pesudo-Boolean polynomials, opposite to maximization of a submodular function which is NP-hard, Alexander Schrijver (2000).

=== Roof Duality ===
If f is a quadratic polynomial, a concept called roof duality can be used to obtain a lower bound for its minimum value. Roof duality may also provide a partial assignment of the variables, indicating some of the values of a minimizer to the polynomial. Several different methods of obtaining lower bounds were developed only to later be shown to be equivalent to what is now called roof duality.

=== Quadratizations ===
If the degree of f is greater than 2, one can always employ reductions to obtain an equivalent quadratic problem with additional variables. One possible reduction is

$$\displaystyle -x_1x_2x_3=\min_{z\in\mathbf{B}}z(2-x_1-x_2-x_3)$$

There are other possibilities, for example,

$$\displaystyle -x_1x_2x_3=\min_{z\in\mathbf{B}}z(-x_1+x_2+x_3)-x_1x_2-x_1x_3+x_1.$$

Different reductions lead to different results. Take for example the following cubic polynomial:

$$\displaystyle f(\boldsymbol{x})=-2x_1+x_2-x_3+4x_1x_2+4x_1x_3-2x_2x_3-2x_1x_2x_3.$$

Using the first reduction followed by roof duality, we obtain a lower bound of −3 and no indication on how to assign the three variables. Using the second reduction, we obtain the (tight) lower bound of −2 and the optimal assignment of every variable (which is ${(0,1,1)}$).

=== Polynomial Compression Algorithms ===
Consider a pseudo-Boolean function $f$ as a mapping from $\{-1,1\}^n$ to $\mathbb{R}$. Then $f(x)= \sum_{I\subseteq [n]}\hat{f}(I)\prod_{i\in I}x_i.$ Assume that each coefficient $\hat{f}(I)$ is integral. Then for an integer $k$ the problem P of deciding whether $f(x)$ is more or equal to $k$ is NP-complete. It is proved in that in polynomial time we can either solve P or reduce the number of variables to $O(k^2\log k).$ Let $r$ be the degree of the above multi-linear polynomial for $f$. Then proved that in polynomial time we can either solve P or reduce the number of variables to $r(k-1)$.

== See also ==
- Boolean function
- Quadratic pseudo-Boolean optimization
