= Electrostatic deflection (structural element) =

In molecular physics/nanotechnology, electrostatic deflection is the deformation of a beam-like structure/element bent by an electric field (Fig. 1). It can be due to interaction between electrostatic fields and net charge or electric polarization effects. The beam-like structure/element is generally cantilevered (fix at one of its ends). In nanomaterials, carbon nanotubes (CNTs) are typical ones for electrostatic deflections.

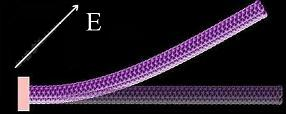

Mechanisms of electric deflection due to electric polarization can be understood as follows:

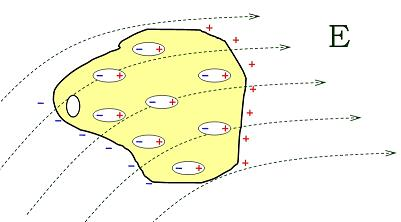

As shown in Fig.2, when a material is brought into an electric field (E), the field tends to shift the positive charge (in red) and the negative charge (in blue) in opposite directions. Thus, induced dipoles are created. Fig. 3 shows a beam-like structure/element in an electric field. The interaction between the molecular dipole moment and the electric field results an induced torque (T). Then this torque tends to align the beam toward the direction of field.

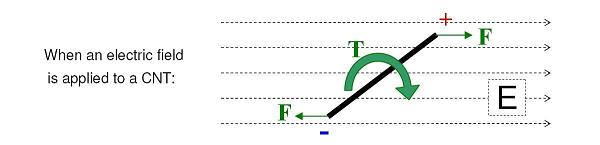

In case of a cantilevered CNT (Fig. 1), it would be bent to the field direction. Meanwhile, the electrically induced torque and stiffness of the CNT compete against each other. This deformation has been observed in experiments. This property is an important characteristic for CNTs promising nanoelectromechanical systems applications, as well as for their fabrication, separation and electromanipulation. Recently, several nanoelectromechanical systems based on cantilevered CNTs have been reported such as: nanorelays, nanoswitches, nanotweezers and feedback device which are designed for memory, sensing or actuation uses. Furthermore, theoretical studies have been carried out to try to get a full understanding of the electric deflection of carbon nanotubes.
