= 1923 in the United Kingdom =

Events from the year 1923 in the United Kingdom.

== Incumbents ==
- Monarch – George V
- Prime Minister - Bonar Law (Conservative) (until 22 May), Stanley Baldwin (Conservative) (starting 23 May)

== Events ==
- 1 January – grouping of virtually all British railway companies which consolidates the railway market into four larger companies.
- 8 January – first outside broadcast by the British Broadcasting Company, a British National Opera Company production of The Magic Flute from the Royal Opera House, Covent Garden.
- 18 January – the Postmaster General grants the BBC a licence for radio broadcasting.
- 13 February – first BBC broadcast from Cardiff (station 5WA).
- 16 February – Discovery of the tomb of Tutankhamun: English archaeologist Howard Carter formally unseals the burial chamber within the tomb of Tutankhamun, a pharaoh of the Eighteenth dynasty of Egypt.
- 6 March – first BBC broadcast from Glasgow (station 5SC).
- 1 April – the Provisional Government of Ireland establishes customs posts on the land border with the UK in Northern Ireland.
- 21 April – the first of a series of innovative modern dress productions of Shakespeare plays, Cymbeline, directed by H. K. Ayliff, opens at Barry Jackson's Birmingham Repertory Theatre.
- 26 April – wedding of Prince Albert, Duke of York, and Lady Elizabeth Bowes-Lyon (the future King George VI and Queen Elizabeth the Queen Mother) in Westminster Abbey. She begins a royal tradition by laying her bouquet at the tomb of the Unknown Warrior in memory of her brother Fergus.
- 28 April – the Empire Stadium, Wembley, is opened to the public for the first time and holds the FA Cup Final between Bolton Wanderers and West Ham United football clubs. Crowds are cleared from the pitch by mounted police, including one on a white horse called Billy.
- 22 May – Bonar Law resigns as Prime Minister due to ill health.
- 23 May – Stanley Baldwin succeeds Bonar Law as Prime Minister.
- 18 July – Matrimonial Causes Act establishes equal rights in divorce for men and women, making it possible for wives to divorce husbands for adultery.
- 31 July – Liquor Act makes it illegal to sell alcoholic beverages to under-eighteens.
- 18 August – 1923 WAAA Championships, the first British national championships for women in track and field, are held in London.
- 25 August – Maine Road football stadium, one of the largest sports stadiums in Britain, opens in Moss Side, Manchester, as the new home of Manchester City F.C. who win 2–1 against Sheffield United in their first game there, on the opening day of the 1923–24 Football League First Division campaign.
- 28 September – first publication of the Radio Times listings magazine by the BBC.
- 10 October – first BBC broadcast from Aberdeen (station 2BD).
- 17 October – first BBC broadcast from Bournemouth (station 6BM).
- 12 November – Her Highness Princess Maud of Fife marries Captain Charles Alexander Carnegie in Wellington Barracks, London.
- 16 November – first BBC broadcast from Sheffield (station 2FL).
- 6 December – the 1923 United Kingdom general election, is won by the Conservative Party led by Stanley Baldwin but without enough seats to form a majority. This is the last UK general election in which a third party wins over 100 seats (158 for the Liberals). Among the new members of parliament is 26-year-old Anthony Eden, the Conservative MP for Warwick and Leamington.
- 10 December – John Macleod wins the Nobel Prize in Physiology or Medicine jointly with Frederick Banting "for the discovery of insulin".
- 31 December – the BBC broadcasts the chimes of Big Ben for the first time.

=== Undated ===
- Littlewoods Pools is formed by 27-year-old Liverpool businessman John Moores.
- State registration of nurses under the Nurses Registration Act 1919 begins; campaigner Ethel Gordon Fenwick is first on the register.
- Dorothy Davis becomes the first woman to qualify as an actuary in the UK.

== Publications ==
- Barbara Cartland's first novel, Jigsaw.
- Agatha Christie's Hercule Poirot novel, The Murder on the Links.
- Philip Gibbs' novel, The Middle of the Road.
- Aldous Huxley's novel, Antic Hay.
- H. J. Massingham's book, Untrodden Ways: Adventures of English Coasts, Heaths and Marshes and also Among the Works of Hudson, Crabbe and Other Country Writers.
- Dorothy L. Sayers' first Lord Peter Wimsey novel, Whose Body?
- P. G. Wodehouse's short story collection, The Inimitable Jeeves.

== Births ==
- 2 January
  - Francis Bennion, barrister (died 2015)
  - Rachel Waterhouse, historian (died 2020)
- 3 January – Graham Chadwick, bishop (died 2007)
- 8 January – Johnny Wardle, cricketer (died 1985)
- 9 January – David Holbrook, writer, poet and academic (died 2011)
- 11 January – Eli Woods, comedian and character actor (died 2014)
- 12 January – Vic Allen, sociologist, economist and historian (died 2014)
- 13 January – Jack Watling, actor (died 2001)
- 15 January – Ivor Cutler, Scottish poet, songwriter and humorist (died 2006)
- 16 January
  - Christine Brooke-Rose, writer and literary critic (died 2012)
  - M. J. Seaton, astronomer (died 2007)
  - Keith Shackleton, painter and television presenter (died 2015)
- 19 January
  - Patricia Moyes, mystery writer (died 2000)
  - Denys Roberts, colonial official and judge (died 2013)
- 20 January
  - Oriel Malet, novelist (died 2014)
  - John Poppitt, footballer (died 2014)
- 26 January – Patricia Hughes, radio announcer (died 2013)
- 27 January – Robert Burchfield, New Zealand-born lexicographer (died 2004)
- 29 January – Alec Coppen, psychiatrist (died 2019)
- 4 February
  - Robert Haslam, industrialist (died 2002)
  - Donald Nicol, Byzantinist (died 2003)
- 7 February
  - Dora Bryan, actress (died 2014)
  - George Lascelles, 7th Earl of Harewood, aristocrat, magazine editor and first cousin of Queen Elizabeth II (died 2011)
- 8 February – Robert Rietti, actor (died 2015)
- 9 February – Mary Barnes, artist (died 2001)
- 11 February – Pamela Sharples, Baroness Sharples, politician (died 2022)
- 12 February – James Chichester-Clark, Prime Minister of Northern Ireland (died 2002)
- 13 February – Yfrah Neaman, Lebanese-born violinist (died 2003)
- 14 February – Joy Lofthouse, World War II pilot (died 2017)
- 17 February – John M. Allegro, English archaeologist and scholar (died 1988)
- 20 February – Rosemary Harris, children's fiction writer (died 2019)
- 22 February
  - Norman Smith, record producer (died 2008)
  - Bleddyn Williams, Welsh rugby player and sportscaster (died 2009)
- 23 February – David Wood, Army officer (died 2009)
- 24 February
  - Alanna Knight, novelist (died 2020)
  - Norman W. Moore, conservationist (died 2015)
- 26 February – John Nye, glaciologist (died 2019)
- 1 March – Ted Briggs, World War II sailor (died 2008)
- 2 March – Basil Hume, cardinal (died 1999)
- 3 March – Pamela Ascherson, sculptor, painter and bombe operator (died 2010)
- 4 March
  - Francis King, author (died 2011)
  - Patrick Moore, astronomer and broadcaster (died 2012)
- 11 March
  - Terence Alexander, actor (died 2009)
  - Joan Joslin, codebreaker (died 2020)
- 15 March – Colin Eaborn, molecular biologist (died 2004)
- 17 March – Robert Boscawen, politician (died 2013)
- 20 March – Helen Landis, actress (died 2015)
- 21 March – Wendy Nicol, Baroness Nicol, politician (died 2018)
- 23 March – Elizabeth Mary Aslin, English art historian (died 1989)
- 25 March – Norman Atkinson, politician (died 2013)
- 26 March – Elizabeth Jane Howard, novelist (died 2014)
- 29 March – Geoff Duke, motorcycle racer (died 2015)
- 2 April – G. Spencer-Brown, mathematician (died 2016)
- 3 April – John Smith, banker, politician and philanthropist (died 2007)
- 4 April
  - John D. Lawson, physicist (died 2008)
  - Peter Vaughan, character actor (died 2016)
- 9 April – Arthur Tolcher, harmonica player (died 1987)
- 13 April – A. H. Halsey, sociologist (died 2014)
- 14 April – Elizabeth Young, Baroness Kennet, writer, researcher and poet (died 2014)
- 15 April
  - Charlie Pawsey, footballer (died 2012)
  - Douglas Wass, civil servant (died 2017)
- 16 April – Stewart Adams, chemist (died 2019)
- 17 April – Lindsay Anderson, filmmaker (died 1994)
- 18 April – Beryl Platt, Baroness Platt of Writtle, engineer and politician (died 2015)
- 21 April
  - Ronald Cass, screenwriter and composer (died 2006)
  - John Mortimer, lawyer and author (died 2009)
- 22 April – Geoffrey Hattersley-Smith, geologist and glaciologist (died 2012)
- 24 April – Cordelia Oliver, Scottish journalist, painter and art critic (died 2009)
- 26 April – Oliver Millar, art historian (died 2007)
- 27 April – John Carol Case, opera singer (died 2012)
- 28 April
  - C. H. Gimingham, botanist (died 2018)
  - Warren Lamb, management consultant (died 2014)
- 2 May – S. F. C. Milsom, barrister and legal historian (died 2016)
- 3 May – Norman Thelwell, cartoonist (died 2004)
- 4 May – Eric Sykes, comedic writer and actor (died 2012)
- 5 May – Richard Wollheim, philosopher (died 2003)
- 7 May – Henry Woods, major general (died 2019)
- 8 May – T. G. H. James, Egyptologist (died 2009)
- 9 May – Barbara New, actress (died 2010)
- 13 May – Betty Webb, code breaker (died 2025)
- 15 May
  - Peter Avery, scholar (died 2008)
  - John Lanchbery, composer (died 2003)
- 16 May – Peter Underwood, author, broadcaster and paranormalist (died 2014)
- 17 May – Michael Beetham, air marshal (died 2015)
- 18 May – Robert Desmond Meikle, botanist (died 2021)
- 20 May – Hugh Beach, general (died 2019)
- 22 May
  - Reg Harrison, footballer (died 2020)
  - Ron Lynch, cricketer (died 2012)
- 25 May – Frank Panton, military scientist (died 2013)
- 26 May – Roy Dotrice, actor (died 2017)
- 29 May – John Parker, 6th Earl of Morley, aristocrat (died 2015)
- 1 June – Barry Till, priest, author and academic (died 2013)
- 2 June
  - Ralph Henstock, mathematician (died 2007)
  - Barbara Smoker, humanist (died 2020)
- 4 June – John Lea, vice admiral (died 2015)
- 5 June
  - Edgar Meddings, Olympic bobsledder (died 2020)
  - Marjorie Thomas, opera singer (died 2008)
- 8 June – Alice Coleman, geographer and academic (died 2023)
- 11 June – Gerard Vaughan, politician and psychiatrist (died 2003)
- 14 June – Judith Kerr, German-born writer and illustrator (died 2019)
- 15 June – David Morley, paediatrician (died 2009)
- 18 June – Jack Rawlings, footballer (died 2016)
- 19 June – Muriel Young, television presenter (died 2001)
- 22 June – Jack Gregory, athlete (died 2003)
- 24 June – Elizabeth Watkins, biographer (died 2012)
- 25 June
  - Stan Clements, footballer (died 2018)
  - Nicholas Mosley, novelist and biographer (died 2017)
- 27 June – Beth Chatto, born Betty Little, plantswoman (died 2018)
- 29 June – Ronnie Ronalde, born Ronald Waldron, yodeller and siffleur (died 2015)
- 30 June
  - James Durbin, statistician and econometrician (died 2012)
  - Bill Ellerington, footballer (died 2015)
- 9 July – Jill Knight, politician (died 2022)
- 13 July – Derek Brewer, mediaevalist (died 2008)
- 14 July – Raymond Harold Sawkins, novelist, chiefly as Colin Forbes (died 2006)
- 15 July – Joe Ekins, soldier (died 2012)
- 16 July
  - Tony Eldridge, Royal Navy officer (died 2015)
  - Reg Prentice, politician (died 2001)
- 17 July – John Cooper, car maker (died 2000)
- 18 July – Michael Medwin, actor and film producer (died 2020)
- 20 July – James Bree, actor (died 2008)
- 23 July – Hughie Kelly, footballer (Blackpool) (died 2009)
- 24 July – Richard Gregory, psychologist (died 2010)
- 25 July – Dennis Lindley, statistician (died 2013)
- 26 July – Bernice Rubens, novelist (died 2004)
- 27 July – Split Waterman, speedway rider (died 2019)
- 28 July – Nigel Seely, aristocrat (died 2019)
- 29 July – Stella Moray, actress (died 2006)
- 1 August – Ward Thomas, television executive (died 2019)
- 2 August
  - Brian Neill, judge (died 2017)
  - Wayland Young, 2nd Baron Kennet, writer and politician (died 2009)
- 4 August
  - Leo Blair, barrister and father of Tony Blair (died 2012)
  - Arthur Butterworth, composer, conductor and teacher (died 2014)
- 6 August – Jack Parnell, drummer and bandleader (died 2010)
- 9 August – Adrian Foley, 8th Baron Foley, composer and aristocrat (died 2012)
- 10 August
  - Anne Balfour-Fraser, film producer (died 2016)
  - Fred Ridgway, cricketer (died 2015)
- 18 August – John Mason, meteorologist (died 2015)
- 19 August – Edgar F. Codd, computer scientist (died 2003)
- 20 August – Ronald Buxton, politician (died 2017)
- 21 August
  - Lady Caroline Faber, aristocrat (died 2016)
  - Larry Grayson, comedian and game show host (died 1995)
  - Emma Smith, author (died 2018)
- 24 August – Mildred Gordon, politician (died 2016)
- 25 August – Dorothy Dunnett, novelist (died 2001)
- 29 August
  - Richard Attenborough, actor and director (died 2014)
  - Marmaduke Hussey, Chairman of the BBC (died 2006)
- 31 August – Edward Boyle, Baron Boyle of Handsworth, politician and administration officer (died 1981)
- 1 September – Michael Uren, businessman and philanthropist (died 2019)
- 3 September – Alan Bristow, businessman (died 2009)
- 7 September – Madeleine Dring, composer and actress (died 1977)
- 13 September – Robert Sheldon, Baron Sheldon, politician (died 2020)
- 16 September – Simon Dawbarn, diplomat (died 2019)
- 19 September – Jack Hearn, judo instructor (died 2026)
- 21 September
  - John Vane, 11th Baron Barnard, nobleman (died 2016)
  - Bert Mozley, footballer (died 2019)
- 22 September – Dannie Abse, poet (died 2014)
- 23 September – Basil Feldman, Baron Feldman, politician and businessman (died 2019)
- 26 September – Hugh Griffiths, Baron Griffiths, soldier, cricketer and life peer (died 2015)
- 28 September
  - William Peters, diplomat and activist (died 2014)
  - John Scott, 9th Duke of Buccleuch, peer and politician (died 2007)
- 29 September – Nicholas Amer, actor (died 2019)
- 30 September – Donald Swann, composer (died 1994)
- 1 October
  - Trevor Ford, Welsh footballer (died 2003)
  - Jeff Hoare, artist and teacher (died 2019)
- 4 October – Tony Dumper, Anglican prelate (died 2012)
- 5 October – Glynis Johns, South African-born actress (died 2024)
- 6 October – Jarvis Astaire, boxing promoter and film producer (died 2021)
- 8 October – Colin Franklin, writer and bibliographer (died 2020)
- 9 October – Donald Sinden, actor (died 2014)
- 10 October
  - Nicholas Parsons, actor and presenter (died 2020)
  - Murray Walker, motorsport commentator (died 2021)
- 13 October – Rosemary Anne Sisson, author and scriptwriter (died 2017)
- 14 October
  - Joel Barnett, politician (died 2014)
  - Nicholas Fisk, children's author (died 2016)
- 17 October – Cyril Shaps, actor (died 2003)
- 18 October – Billie Love, actress and photographer (died 2012)
- 19 October – Eric Stanley, literary scholar and historian (died 2018)
- 20 October
  - Bernard Crossland, engineer (died 2011)
  - Patrick Jordan, actor (died 2020)
- 24 October
  - Bernard Conlan, politician (died 2013)
  - Robin Day, political broadcaster (died 2000)
  - Denise Levertov, English-born American poet (died 1997)
- 25 October – Belita (Jepson-Turner), Olympic skater and film actress (died 2005)
- 26 October – Robert Hinde, zoologist (died 2016)
- 27 October
  - Peter Bryant, actor and television producer (died 2006)
  - Peter Graham Scott, film producer (died 2007)
- 30 October – Dorothy Thompson, historian (died 2011)
- 1 November
  - Wynn Hugh-Jones, diplomat and politician (died 2019)
  - James Ramsden, politician (died 2020)
- 3 November – Tomás Ó Fiaich, cardinal (died 1990)
- 6 November – Donald Houston, actor (died 1991)
- 9 November
  - Eric Parsons, footballer (died 2011)
  - Jack Scott, weather forecaster (died 2008)
- 12 November – Ian Graham, archaeologist and explorer (died 2017)
- 11 November
  - Donald Michie, AI researcher (died 2007)
  - Laurie Topp, footballer (died 2017)
- 15 November
  - Peter Hammond, actor (died 2011)
  - James Jungius, vice admiral (died 2020)
  - Michael Lapage, Olympic rower (died 2018)
- 18 November – Henry Leach, Royal Navy officer (died 2011)
- 20 November – Ernest Ambler, physicist (died 2017)
- 25 November – Donald Chapman, politician (died 2013)
- 26 November
  - Euan Howard, 4th Baron Strathcona and Mount Royal, politician (died 2018)
  - Pat Phoenix, actress (died 1986)
- 28 November – Annette Allcock, artist and illustrator (died 2001)
- 30 November – Frank Hooley, politician (died 2015)
- 3 December – Trevor Bailey, cricketer (died 2011)
- 4 December – Simon Bland, soldier and courtier (died 2022)
- 6 December – Euan Lloyd, film producer (died 2016)
- 7 December
  - James Clarke, footballer (died 2014)
  - Abraham Goldberg, doctor (died 2007)
- 10 December – Michael Gill, television producer (died 2005)
- 12 December
  - John Pulman, snooker player (died 1998)
  - Richard Gilbert Scott, architect (died 2017)
- 13 December – Frankie Fraser, gangster (died 2014)
- 15 December – Freeman Dyson, physicist (died 2020)
- 18 December – Edwin Bramall, field marshal (died 2019)
- 19 December – Gordon Jackson, Scottish actor (died 1990)
- 20 December – James Leasor, historian and novelist (died 2007)
- 21 December – Arthur Oglesby, fisherman and author (died 2000)
- 22 December – Peregrine Worsthorne, journalist and newspaper editor (died 2020)
- 29 December
  - Robert Ford, general (died 2015)
  - Denis Haynes, cricketer (died 2012)

== Deaths ==
- 9 January
  - Katherine Mansfield, novelist (born 1888 in New Zealand; died in France)
  - Edith Thompson and Frederick Bywaters, couple convicted of murder (Thompson born 1893, Bywaters born 1902; hanged)
- 14 January – Frederic Harrison, English historian (born 1831)
- 16 March – George Bean, cricketer (born 1864)
- 27 March – Sir James Dewar, chemist (born 1842)
- 4 April – John Venn, mathematician (born 1834)
- 5 April – George Herbert, 5th Earl of Carnarvon, English financier of Egyptian excavations (born 1866)
- 21 May
  - Ferdinand Walsin Esterhazy, French military traitor (born 1847)
  - Charles Kent, English-born stage and film actor, in the United States (born 1852)
- 22 May – Lady Constance Bulwer-Lytton, suffragette (born 1869)
- 9 June – Princess Helena of the United Kingdom (born 1846)
- 12 June – Kate Bishop, actress (born 1848)
- 14 June – Mansfield Smith-Cumming, naval officer and first director of the Secret Intelligence Service (born 1859)
- 10 July – Albert Chevalier, music hall comedian (born 1861)
- 15 July – Janey Sevilla Callander, theatre producer and society hostess (born 1846)
- 30 July – Sir Charles Hawtrey, actor (born 1858)
- 23 August – Ernest Francis Bashford, oncologist (born 1873)
- 26 August – Hertha Ayrton, electrical engineer, inventor and suffragette (born 1854)
- 30 August – William Baldock, cricketer (born 1847)
- 23 September – John Morley, 1st Viscount Morley of Blackburn, politician, editor (born 1838)
- 30 October – Bonar Law, Prime Minister of the United Kingdom (born 1858)
- 5 December – Herbert Standing, actor (born 1846)
- 8 December – John William Brodie-Innes, member of Golden Dawn (born 1848)
- 9 December – Meggie Albanesi, actress (born 1899)
- 10 December – Thomas George Bonney, geologist (born 1833)

== See also ==
- List of British films of 1923
