= Oglesby =

Oglesby is a surname, a variant of Ogilvy. It can refer to:

== People ==
=== Surname ===
- Alfred Oglesby (1967–2009), professional American footballer
- Arthur Oglesby (1923–2000), British fisherman, writer and broadcaster
- Carl Oglesby (1935–2011), American writer, academic, and political activist
- Carole A. Oglesby (born 1938), American athlete, physical educator, sports coach
- Cedric Oglesby (born 1977), American football player
- Erskine Oglesby (1937–2004), American tenor saxophonist and blues singer
- Evan Oglesby (born 1981), American football cornerback
- Jamie Oglesby (1929–2013), American politician
- Jim Oglesby (1905–1955), American Major League Baseball player
- John G. Oglesby (1873–1938), lieutenant governor of Illinois
- Paul Oglesby (1939–1994), American football player
- Randy Oglesby (born 1949), American actor
- Richard J. Oglesby (1824–1899), governor of Illinois
- Sadie and Mabry Oglesby, 20th century Bahá'ís of Boston
- Terrence Oglesby (born 1988), American professional basketball player
- Washington J. Oglesby (1859–1902), American lawyer, an early Black lawyer in California
- Woodson R. Oglesby (1867–1955), US congressman from New York

=== Given name ===
- Nathaniel Oglesby Calloway (1907–1979), American chemist and physician
- Virginia Oglesby Fox (died 1982), American actress in silent films
- Richard Oglesby Marsh (1883–1953), American engineer, explorer, diplomat, and ethnologist

== Places ==
=== United States ===
- Oglesby, Illinois, city in LaSalle County, Illinois
- Oglesby, Texas, city in Coryell County, Texas
- Oglesby, Oklahoma
- Oglesby, Georgia

== Music ==
- Oglesby, a contemporary Christian band
