= Pfeffer integral =

Definition of mathematical integration

In mathematics, the Pfeffer integral is an integration technique created by Washek Pfeffer as an attempt to extend the Henstock–Kurzweil integral to a multidimensional domain. This was to be done in such a way that the fundamental theorem of calculus would apply analogously to the theorem in one dimension, with as few preconditions on the function under consideration as possible. The integral also permits analogues of the chain rule and other theorems of the integral calculus for higher dimensions.

== Definition ==
The construction is based on the Henstock or gauge integral, however Pfeffer proved that the integral, at least in the one dimensional case, is less general than the Henstock integral. It relies on what Pfeffer refers to as a set of bounded variation, this is equivalent to a Caccioppoli set. The Riemann sums of the Pfeffer integral are taken over partitions made up of such sets, rather than intervals as in the Riemann or Henstock integrals. A gauge is used, exactly as in the Henstock integral, except that the gauge function may be zero on a negligible set.

== Properties ==
Pfeffer defined a notion of generalized absolute continuity $ACG^*$, close to but not equal to the definition of a function being $ACG_*$, and proved that a function is Pfeffer integrable if it is the derivative of an $ACG^*$ function. He also proved a chain rule for the Pfeffer integral. In one dimension his work as well as similarities between the Pfeffer integral and the McShane integral indicate that the integral is more general than the Lebesgue integral and yet less general than the Henstock–Kurzweil integral.

== Bibliography ==
- Bongiorno, Benedetto; Pfeffer, Washek (1992), "A concept of absolute continuity and a Riemann type integral", Comment. Math. Univ. Carolinae, 33 (2): 189–196
- Pfeffer, Washek (1992), "A Riemann type definition of a variational integral", Proc. Amer. Math. Soc., 114: 99–106, doi:10.1090/s0002-9939-1992-1072090-2
