= Dienes =

Dienes may refer to:

- Dienes (surname), including a list of people with the name
- the plural of diene, a class of organic chemical compound
- Base ten blocks used in mathematics education, also known as Dienes blocks or simply dienes
