= Orshi Drozdik =

Hungarian feminist artist (born 1946)

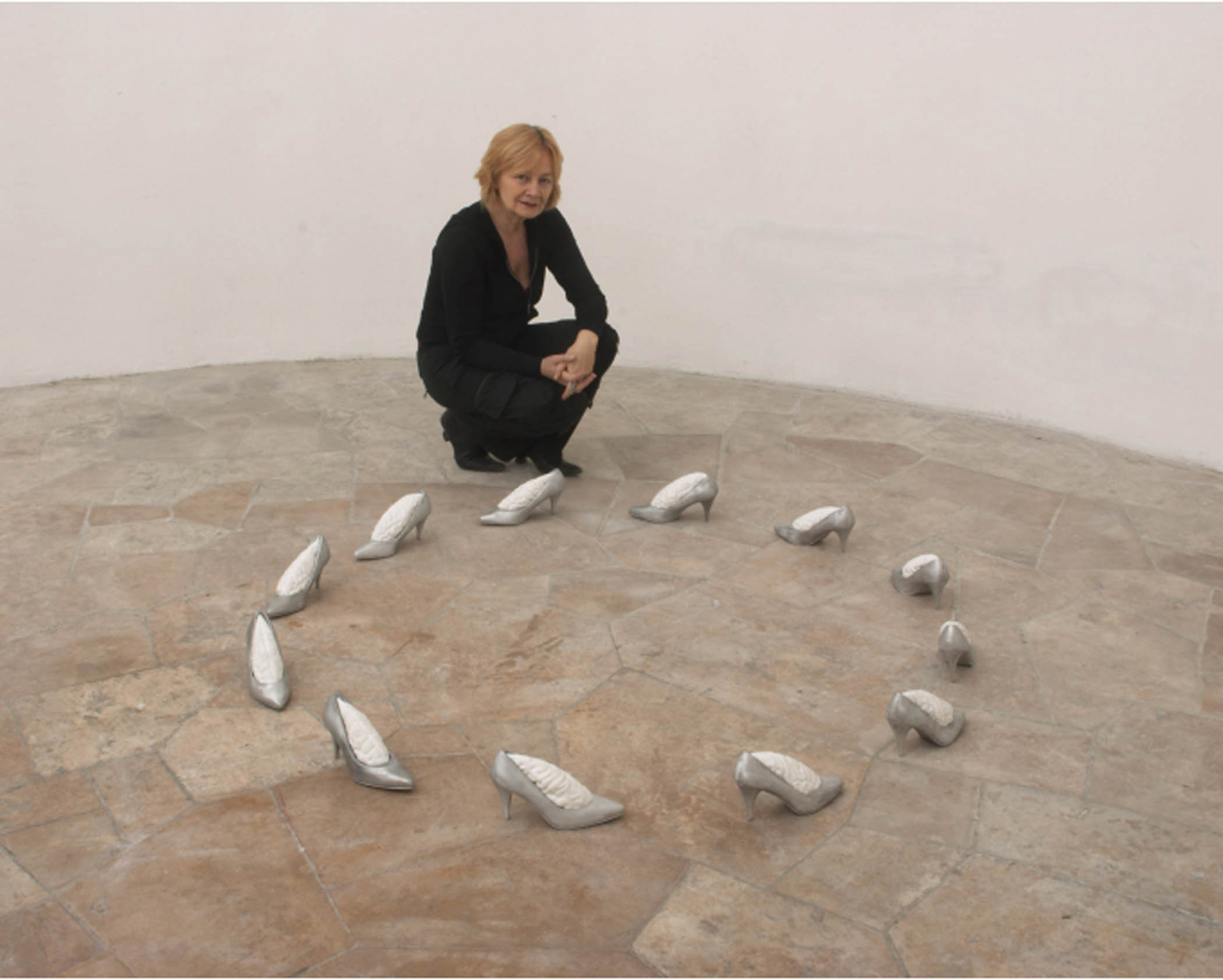
- Orshi Drozdik with the installation Brains on High Heels, 1993. Photo, 2006
- Born: Orsolya Drozdik; February 15, 1946 (age 80); Abda, Hungary
- Education: Hungarian University of Fine Arts
- Known for: Conceptual Art, Feminist Art, Contemporary Art, Contemporary Feminist Art, Feminist Art from the 70s, Feminist Conceptual Artists
- Style: Feminist art
- Website: orshidrozdik.com orshidrozdik.hu

Orshi Drozdik (born 1946 in Hungary) is a feminist visual artist based in New York City. Her work consists of drawings, paintings, photographs, etchings, performances, videos, sculptures, installations, academic writings and fiction, that explore connected themes, sometimes over an extended period. Through her work, organized into several topics, she explores themes that undermine the traditional and erotic representation of women: Individual Mythologies, Adventure in Tecnos Dystopium, and Manufacturing the Self. She is influenced by Valéria Dienes, János Zsilka, Susan Sontag, Ludwig Wittgenstein, Luce Irigaray, Walter Benjamin, and Michel Foucault, among others. (Note: Valéria Dienes (1879 – 1978) Hungarian feminist, philosopher and choreographer, János Zsilka (1930-1999) Hungarian linguist, semiotic studies, Susan Sontag (1933 – 2004) writer On Pornographic Imagination, Ludwig Wittgenstein, (1889 – 1951) Tractatus Logico-Philosophicus, Luce Irigaray, 1930 French linguist and feminist, This Sex Which is Not OneLuce Irigaray#This Sex Which is Not One (Ce sexe qui n'en est pas un), Michel Foucault (1926 – 1984) The Order of Things, and Walter Benjamin, among others.) Her working method: critical analysis of meaning, influenced her contemporaries, her students and later generations of women artists. The art historian László Beke noted in an interview realized by Kata Krasznahorkai in 2017 that "Orsolya Drozdik (Orshi Drozdik) is the first feminist artist in Hungary".

== Biography ==
=== Early life ===
Drozdik grew up in Abda and Győr in Hungary. Her mother lived with her family in Pozsony (today Bratislava) until the end of World War II. In 1945 they were stripped of their property and citizenship by the anti-Hungarian Beneš decrees without compensation and forced to relocate. The government labeled her father a class enemy, like most middle class intellectuals, and his property was confiscated. In 1956, after her father's death, she decided to be an artist. With the support of her mother (who raised Orshi, her sister Ildikó and brother Béla alone), she started to learn formal drawing and painting in an evening drawing study group. Drozdik studied art at the Hungarian University of Fine Arts (1970-1977), in Budapest. She holds an MFA 1977 and PhD in Liberal Arts 2003.

=== 1970–79 ===
Starting in the 1970s and disregarding the patriarchal representation of the female body, she focused on the female point of view; she performed and made art in Budapest at the same time as Marina Abramović in Belgrade. She searched for meaning and significance in her personal experiences; combining the textual with the visual.

From 1975, she created a critical, feminist methodology to investigate patriarchal representation. As a student of the Hungarian Academy of Fine Arts, and under her birth name, Drozdik Orsolya, she researched and examined 19th and early 20th century academic documents of the female nude-model settings in the archive of the academy's library. She photographed and "appropriated" these photo-images for her concept ImageBank; (Note: she did not use this terminology at that time only later, instead she invented the concept of "image bank.") a semiotic study of patriarchal art history, academic training, -education; an image analysis of appropriated images; projected, manipulated and unmanipulated; these were exhibited: NudeModel (1976-1977), and Individual Mythology (1975-1977). The title Individual Mythology is a reference to Harald Szeemann's "Individual Mythologies" section at the documenta 5, Kassel, 1972 and Joseph Beuys.

Using her own body, she created feminist performance art, photos, drawings, and installations in order to investigate patriarchal representation. Her methodology, her "feminist conceptual art" continued, in Pornography (1978–79), a critical analysis of pornographic representation, and In Someones Shadows (1979), Diverting Diagonal (1979–80), Double (1980), and in I Try to be transparent (to art history) (1980). Later, she amended her methods as critical representations deconstruction of meaning and theories of representation to encompass various fields, mediums and concepts. At the same time, she performed and exhibited photographs offset prints and drawings, address the complexities of political and personal. Exploring the relationship between the visual and the linguistic, thus connecting her concepts as in the Renaissance of the Biblical text, for instance, to images.

In the mid-seventies, rebelling against the educational and political systems, she found her voice. From 1975, she exhibited in Budapest and internationally in socialist countries, and worked in association with "Rozsa" (Roses), a young artists' post-conceptual group (1976–78). In 1978, she married Andreas De Jong, left Hungary, lived in Amsterdam, 1979, divorced and moved to Vancouver, Toronto; then in 1980 to New York City. She lived in Vancouver, Toronto and New York City between 1979 and 1991 with the novelist Patrick McGrath.

=== 1980-1999 ===
In the early 1980s, Drozdik worked in association with the artist group Colab. From 1984, she started to work on her decades long project Adventure in Technos Dystopium; deconstructing 18th and 19th century scientific representation of truth and reality. She photographed the displays in European and American science museums, resulting in the series of photographs titled Dystopium Infinete. Adventure in Technos Dystopium derived Popular Natural Philosophy, (1988), Morbid Condition, (1989), Fragmenta Naturae, (1990), and Cynical Reason (1990-91) referencing the Age of Reason. She exhibited at the Tom Cugliani Gallery (1988-1893), the Richard Anderson Gallery (1990–95), and the New Museum, (Note: New Digital Archive Museum: "Strange Attractors: Signs of Chaos," "Strange Attractions: An Evening of Chaotic Performance," "The Interrupted Life," "Museum as Hub: Report on the Construction of a Spaceship Module") 1989, 1991, Age and at the 9th Biennale of Sydney in 1992.

In late 90s she exhibited in Hungarian and Central European institutions including the Ernst Museum in Budapest, the Adventure in Technos Dystopium (1990), 3 by 3 from Hungary (1996) at the Center for Curatorial Studies, New York. and The New Arrivals: 8 Contemporary Artists from Hungary, (2011) and at the Palais des Beaux-Arts, Brussels., among others. Her photographic installations of the late 1980s and 1900s are a production of a new Body Space, a project that reflects the video installation of Tony Oursler. In 1983 she produced through the legacy of Andreas Vesalius the drawing series, Dissection of Artaud, Foucalt and Vesalius (1983–84), Drozdik's statement on the link between the dissectional probings of the body and her gender concerns.

=== 2000 ===
In the years of 2000 Drozdik had major retrospective exhibitions showing different aspects of her work: Adventure and Appropriation 1975-2001 were exhibited at the Ludwig Museum in Budapest - Museum of Contemporary Art, Ludwig Museum and Museum of Contemporary Art, Budapest 2001–02, Passion After Appropriation in Museum of Contemporary Art Muzej Suvremene Umjetnosti, Zagreb, and in The Art Pavilion in Zagreb, Croatia, 2002, Individual Mythology - Medical Venus - Young and Beautiful, Municipal Museum of Art, Győr, 2003, The Other Venus, MODEM 2011, Contemporary Art Center. Debrecen, Hungary. In 2006 Drozdik published a book titled Individuális Mitológia, konceptuálistól a postmodernig, (Individual Mythology From Conceptual to Postmodern Gondolat Publishing IBNS 9639567795) a summary of her thoughts, methodology and work process, focusing on her starting point the 1970s conceptual movements in Hungary.

== Work ==
Drozdik in her work exposes social issues that are embedded within a cultural system, thus countering a range of representations in regards facts and scientific truths within the discourses of art, medical, and scientific history.

=== Performance ===
Her works, Individual Mythology (1975–77) and Nude model (1977), comprising performance, photography, offset prints and drawings, were exhibited in Budapest. In this series, she started to deconstruct the representations of female body based on her original concept named Image Bank, in Hungarian Képban elmélet (1975), in which she defined her methodology using existing representations to unfold and reinterpret meaning. Inspired by Valéria Dienes, the philosopher and dancer, she was able to link her female point of view to the early feminist movement, that was powerful in Hungary before WWII. A harbinger in the Eastern Bloc, Drozdik focused on the methodology of representation - using the early 20 century "Free Dancer" movements in Hungary as a starting point - to construct a discourse of feminist art. The Pornography (1978) series was completed in Amsterdam, I Try To Be Transparent (1980), performance and the Double (1980) in Toronto and Genius (1989) New Museum - Digital Archive in New Museum, New York

=== Photography ===
Individual Mythology (1975–77), Nude model (1977), Cammon Symbols (1976–77), Blink and Sigh, (1977), Pornography (1978–79), Temporary Coherence (1979–80), Adventure in Technos Dystopium (1984-1996), Manufacturing the Self (1990-96)

=== Video ===
Individual Mythology, (1977-2014), Individual Mythology: Play It Again, Drozdik (2014), Double (1980), I try to be transparent (1980), Genius (1989), My Mother, Erzsébet Kockás's Strudel (1997), Young and Beautiful, Oshi Ohashi: Young and Beautiful, Confident Cosmetic Line (1997), It's All Over Now Baby Blue (2015), Stripes à la Sol LeWitt, (painting performance with musical accompaniment by Krisztina Megyeri 's composition, Hohes Ufer II (2014)

=== Installation ===
Adventure in Technos Dystopium (1984–1993) deconstructed scientific representations of truth. For this series Drozdik created a fictional 18th century female scientist, Edith Simpson. Some of the themes she explored were the romanticizing of disease and the taxonomic formalism of Carl Linnaeus.

From 1989 Drozdik used models of her father's brain as part of a sculptural installations.

In 1988, 1989, and 1990, she exhibited at the Tom Cugliani Gallery. (Note: 1992 accompanied with a catalogue titled Science Fiction. MIT exhibition catalogue 1992.) Drozdik continued to produce and exhibit feminist work, and deconstructing the patriarchal, scientific gaze, including, in 1986, inventing the 18th Century pseudo-persona of Edith Simpson, (Note: The Life of Edith Simpson, Epitome of the Enlightenment, National Genius of Art and Science. Orshi Drozdik, New York, 1986)(1983–88); a woman scientist complete with her own heritage. Her installation series entitled Manufacturing the Self (1993–97) is a deconstruction of medical representations of the female body. Drozdik's 1993-04 exhibition Medical Erotic, part of the Manufacturing the Self series, featured a cast of the Drozdik's body alongside photographs of a medical wax-work figure and a fictional journal. The installation Manufacturing The Self, Brains on High Heels (1992), a rubber cast of a brain inserted into a pair of high heels. Exhibited first in Sydney Biennial in 1992–93.

=== Conceptual painting series ===
Art history and Me (1982) she created a new series of paintings titled Lipstick Paintings ala Fontana (2002–06) in which the surface of canvases are punctured with lipstick. The series of digital prints Venuses, Drapery and Bodyfolds (2000–2007) featured fragments of draperies and naked women from the history of art. A series of exhibitions titled All Over Now Baby Blue were exhibited from 2013 to 2015, Stripes Ala Sol Levitt in 2015.

=== Book ===
Orshi Drozdik: Individuális Mitológia, konceptuálistól a postmodernig, (Individual Mythology From Conceptual to Postmodern), Gondolat Publishing, 2006, Budapest IBNS 9639567795,

== Selected works ==
- 1975-76 The line, etching style animation
- 1975-77 Nude Model I, II, III,, series of photos and performances
- 1975-76 Situation, series of photos
- 1975-77 Individual Mythology I, II, III,, series of performances, photos and photo offsets Individuális mitológia
- 1976-77 Individual Mythology, Out of Cage, performance and photos, offset
- 1977 Blink and Sigh I, II, III,, series of performances and photos
- 1976-77 Common symbols, series of photos and photo offsets
- 1978-79 Pornography I, II, III,, series of performances, photos, xeroxes
- 1979 On My Beauty
- 1980 I try To Be Transparent (to art history), performance, photos
- 1978-80 In Some One Shadows I, II, series of photos, xeroxes, drawings, installations
- 1980 Diverting the Diagonal I, II, series of performances, photos, xeroxes
- 1982 Art History and Me
- 1983-85 Biological Metaphors
- 1984 Biological Metaphors At the Budapest Galeria,
- 1984 Adventure in Tecnos Dystopium
- 1986 The Life of Edith Simpson, Epitome of the Enlightenment, National Genius of Art and Science. Orshi Drozdik, New York.
- 1986 The Hierarchy of Organs (Note: The Hierarchy of Organs text by Orshi Drozdik. Originally published in:Physical Relief. The Bertha and Karl Leubsdorf Art Gallery at Hunter College, 1991.)
- 1987 Love Letter to the Leyden Jar (Note: First published in Orshi Drozdik, Adventure in Tecnos Dystopium (Ernst Museum, Budapest, 1900) exhibition catalogue.)
- 1990-91 Cynical Reason I, II, III, installation
- 1993-97 Manufacturing the Self: Medical Erotic, 1993, Body Self, 1994, Brains on High Heels, 1992, Nun Self, 1994
- 1993-2007 Lipstick Paintings, painting series with lipstick
- 2004 My Life as an 18th Century Scientist, installation
- 2007 Venuses: Draperies and Folds of the Body
- 2009-10 Un Chandelier Maria Theresa, installation
- 2011-2012 The Other Venus
- 2013 It's All Over Now Baby Blue
- 2013 It's All Over Now Baby Blue, paintings, drawings, performance series [24]
- 2015 Stripes ala Sol LeWitt, performance, paintings, installation
- 2018 CellPaintings, paintings
- 2018 Sensuality and Matter, paintings, drawings
- 2019 O.D.F.A.M.Orshi Drozdik Feminist Art Museum traveling art museum
- 2019-20 Medea Insurrection: Radical Women Artists Behind the Iron Curtain

== Awards and membership ==
- 1976 Kondor Béla Award of the Hungarian Academy of Fine Arts, Budapest, Hungary
- 1977 Stipend of the Young Artist's Studio, Budapest, Hungary
- 1985 Prince Bernhard Foundation fellowship, Amsterdam, the Netherlands
- 1990 The Pollock-Krasner Foundation Grant, New York, USA
- 1990 The Gordon Matta-Clark Trust fellowship, New York, USA (Note: Gordon Matta-Clark Trust. 500.1992.1. © 2019 Estate of Gordon Matta-Clark)
- 1991 Cartier Foundation Fellowship, Paris, France
- 1993 The Pollock-Krasner Foundation grant, New York, USA
- 1993–95 CAVA, Career Advancement of Visual Artists fellowship, Miami, FL, USA
- 1994 Austrian Ministry of Culture fellowship, Vienna, Austria
- 1995 New York Foundation for the Arts, Women Photographers Catalog Project, New York, USA
- 2001 The Adolph and Esther Gottlieb Foundation scholarship, New York, USA
- 2003/04 Landis & Gyr Foundation grant, Zug, Switzerland
- 2003 Munkácsy Mihály State Art Award, hu:Munkácsy-díj Munkacsy Mihaly Hungary
- 2015 Széchenyi Academy of Letters and Arts
- Drozdik is member of SZIMA, The Hungarian Academy of Sciences and the Arts

== See also ==
- List of Hungarians
- Feminist theory
- Feminism in culture
- Feminist philosophy
- Conceptual Art
- Body Art
- Feminism
