= Judo Jack =

Judo Jack may refer to:

- Jack Hatton (1995–2019), American judoka
- Jack Hearn (1923–2026), English judo instructor
