= Washek Pfeffer =

Washek F. Pfeffer (November 14, 1936 – January 3, 2021) was a Czech-born American mathematician and Emeritus Professor at the University of California, Davis. Pfeffer was one of the world's pre-eminent authorities on real integration and has authored several books on the topic of integration, and numerous papers on these topics and others related to many areas of real analysis and measure theory. Pfeffer gave his name to the Pfeffer integral, which extends a Riemann-type construction for the integral of a measurable function both to higher-dimensional domains and, in the case of one dimension, to a superset of the Lebesgue integrable functions.
