= Tibor Šalát =

Slovak mathematician (1926–2005)

- Born: May 13, 1926; Vajka nad Žitavou, Slovakia
- Died: May 14, 2005 (aged 79); Bratislava, Slovakia
- Education: Charles University in Prague
- Known for: Number theory Real analysis
- Scientific career
- Fields: Mathematician
- Workplaces: Comenius University in Bratislava

Tibor Šalát (May 13, 1926 – May 14, 2005) was a Slovak mathematician, professor of mathematics, and Doctor of Mathematics who specialized in number theory and real analysis. He was the author and co-author of undergraduate and graduate textbooks in mathematics, mostly in Slovak. And most of his scholarly papers have been published in various scientific journals.

== Life ==
Originally from Žitava by the southern region of Slovakia, he studied at the Faculty of Natural Sciences of Charles University in Prague, where in 1952 he defended a dissertation entitled Príspevok k teorii súčtov a nekonečných radov s reálnými členami and supervised by Miloš Kössler and Vojtěch Jarník. In 1952 he went to work at the Faculty of Natural Sciences of Comenius University in Bratislava, where he became an assistant professor in 1962. He was appointed to a full professorship position in 1972. And in 1974, he earned a Ph.D. in Mathematics from the same institution.

He specialized in Cantor's expansions, uniform distribution, statistical convergence, summation methods and theory of numbers.

He wrote several undergraduate and graduate textbooks.

== Academic papers ==
- Juraj Činčura; Tibor Šalát; Martin Sleziak; Vladimír Toma (2005). "Sets of statistical cluster points and ℐ-cluster points". Real Analysis Exchange. 30 (2): 565–580. doi:10.14321/realanalexch.30.2.0565. MR 2177419.
- Pavel Kostyrko; Władysław Wilczyński; Tibor Šalát (2001). "I-Convergence". Real Analysis Exchange. 26 (2): 669–686. MR 1844385.
- Tibor Šalát (1980). "On statistically convergent sequences of real numbers". Mathematica Slovaca. 30 (2): 139–150. MR 0587239.
- Tibor Šalát; S. James Taylor; János T. Tóth (1998). "Radii of Convergence of Power Series". Real Analysis Exchange. 24 (1): 263–274. doi:10.2307/44152953. JSTOR 44152953. MR 1691750.
- Ján Borsík; Jaroslav Červeňanský; Tibor Šalát (1995). "Remarks on functions preserving convergence of infinite series". Real Analysis Exchange. 21 (2): 725–731. doi:10.2307/44152683. JSTOR 44152683. MR 1407285.
- M. Dindoš; T. Šalát; V. Toma (2003). "Statistical Convergence of Infinite Series". Czechoslovak Mathematical Journal. 53 (4): 989–1000. doi:10.1023/B:CMAJ.0000024535.89828.e8. hdl:10338.dmlcz/127854. MR 2018844. S2CID 121987409.
- Tibor Šalát (2000). "Remarks on Steinhaus' property and ratio sets of sets of positive integers". Czechoslovak Mathematical Journal. 50 (1): 175–183. doi:10.1023/A:1022457724187. hdl:10338.dmlcz/127559. MR 1745470. S2CID 117275867.
- Tibor Šalát (2000). "On uniform distribution of sequences". Czechoslovak Mathematical Journal. 50 (2): 331–340. doi:10.1023/A:1022422919181. hdl:10338.dmlcz/127572. MR 1761390. S2CID 117677265.
