= Bohuslav Diviš =

Czech mathematician

Bohuslav Diviš (December 20, 1942 – July 26, 1976) was a Czech mathematician, who worked in the field of number theory.

== Biography ==
Bohuslav Diviš was born on December 20, 1942, in Prague. He won the Czechoslovak and International Mathematical Olympiad in 1959 and then studied mathematics at Charles University in Prague (as a student of Vojtěch Jarník). He wrote his thesis in 1966 and his doctorate in 1969 with a thesis on "superlattice points in multidimensional ellipsoids" at the Heidelberg University under Peter Roquette.

In 1970 Diviš became assistant professor at Ohio State University (USA), and after 1973 an associate professor. He authored about 20 scientific articles.

On July 26, 1976, during a conference visit to Illinois State University in Normal, Illinois, he died of heart failure at the age of 33.

== Literature ==
- B. Diviš: On the sums of continued fractions, Acta Arithmetica 22, 157–173, 1973
- ders.: Lattice point theory of irrational ellipsoids with an arbitrary center, Monatsh. Math. 83, 279–307, 1977
- ders.: Ω-estimates in lattice point theory, Acta Arithmetica 35, 247–258, 1979
- F. Fricker: Einführung in die Gitterpunktlehre, Birkhäuser, 1982
