= Edward J. McShane =

American mathematician

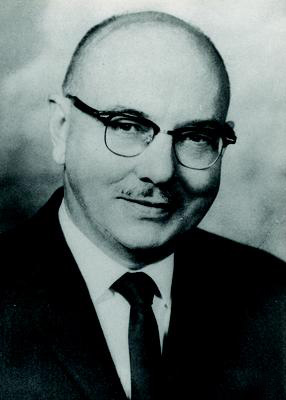
- Born: 10 May 1904; New Orleans, Louisiana, US
- Died: 1 June 1989 (aged 85); Charlottesville, Virginia, US
- Education: University of Chicago
- Awards: Chauvenet Prize (1953)
- Scientific career
- Fields: Mathematics
- Doctoral advisors: Gilbert Ames Bliss

Edward James McShane (May 10, 1904 – June 1, 1989) was an American mathematician noted for his advancements of the calculus of variations, integration theory, stochastic calculus, and exterior ballistics. His name is associated with the McShane–Whitney extension theorem and McShane integral. McShane was professor of mathematics at the University of Virginia, president of the American Mathematical Society, president of the Mathematical Association of America, a member of the National Science Board and a member of both the National Academy of Sciences and the American Philosophical Society.

== Life and career ==
McShane was born and raised in New Orleans. He received his bachelor of engineering and Bachelor of Science degrees from Tulane University in 1925, following with a M.S. degree from Tulane in 1927. McShane received his Ph.D. in mathematics from the University of Chicago. He taught at the University of Virginia for 39 years until he retired in 1974. His doctoral students include Victor Klee, Billy James Pettis, and David Lowdenslager, who collaborated with Henry Helson. McShane died of congestive heart failure at the University of Virginia hospital.

== Selected publications ==
=== Articles ===
- McShane, E. J. (1931). "A remark concerning the necessary condition of Weierstrass". Bulletin of the American Mathematical Society. 37 (8): 631–632. doi:10.1090/S0002-9904-1931-05233-2. MR 1562210.
- McShane, E. J. (1933). "Parametrizations of saddle surfaces, with application to the problem of plateau". Transactions of the American Mathematical Society. 35 (3): 716–733. doi:10.1090/S0002-9947-1933-1501713-3. MR 1501713.
- McShane, E. J. (1934). "On the minimizing property of the harmonic function". Bulletin of the American Mathematical Society. 40 (8): 593–598. doi:10.1090/S0002-9904-1934-05923-8. MR 1562913.
- McShane, E. J. (1934). "Extension of range of functions". Bulletin of the American Mathematical Society. 40 (12): 837–842. doi:10.1090/S0002-9904-1934-05978-0. MR 1562984. (over 650 citations)
- McShane, E. J. (1935). "Existence theorems for double integral problems of the calculus of variations". Transactions of the American Mathematical Society. 38 (3): 549–563. doi:10.1090/S0002-9947-1935-1501828-1. MR 1501828.
- McShane, E. J. (1937). "Jensen's inequality". Bulletin of the American Mathematical Society. 43 (8): 521–527. doi:10.1090/S0002-9904-1937-06588-8. MR 1563579.
- McShane, E. J. (1939). "On the uniqueness of the solutions of differential equations". Bulletin of the American Mathematical Society. 45 (10): 755–757. doi:10.1090/S0002-9904-1939-07076-6. MR 0000328.
- McShane, E. J. (1940). "A remark concerning sufficiency theorems for the problem of Bolza". Bull. Amer. Math. Soc. 46 (8): 698–701. doi:10.1090/S0002-9904-1940-07284-2.
- McShane, E. J. (1942). "On Perron integration". Bulletin of the American Mathematical Society. 48 (10): 718–726. doi:10.1090/S0002-9904-1942-07766-4. MR 0007040.
- McShane, E. J. (1950). "Linear functionals on certain Banach spaces". Proceedings of the American Mathematical Society. 1 (3): 402–408. doi:10.1090/S0002-9939-1950-0036448-5. MR 0036448.
- McShane, E. J. (1956). "On Stieltjes integration". Proceedings of the American Mathematical Society. 7: 69–74. doi:10.1090/S0002-9939-1956-0075280-9. MR 0075280.
- McShane, E. J. (1962). "The Radius of Gyration of a Convex Body". Proceedings of the American Mathematical Society. 13 (6): 922–926. doi:10.2307/2034088. JSTOR 2034088. S2CID 122564457.
- McShane, E. J. (1963). "Integrals devised for special purposes". Bulletin of the American Mathematical Society. 69 (5): 597–627. doi:10.1090/S0002-9904-1963-10964-7. MR 0162905.

=== Books ===
- McShane, E. J. (1944). Integration. Princeton: Princeton University Press. 2nd edition. 1947.
- McShane, E. J. (1953). Order-preserving maps and integration processes. Princeton: Princeton University Press. ISBN 0691095825.
- McShane, E. J.; Kelley, John L.; Reno, Franklin V. (1953). Exterior ballistics. The University of Denver Press.
- McShane, E. J.; Botts, Truman Arthur (1959). Real analysis. Princeton: Van Nostrand. Bibcode:1959rean.book.....M. McShane, Edward James; Botts, Truman Arthur (2013). Dover reprint. Courier Corporation. ISBN 9780486165677.
- McShane, E. J. (1969). A Riemann-type integral that includes Lebesgue-Stieltjes, Bochner and stochastic integrals. Memoirs of the American Mathematical Society, Number 88. Providence, Rhode Island: American Mathematical Society. ISBN 9780821812884; 54 pages
- McShane, E. J. (1974). Stochastic calculus and stochastic models. New York: Academic Press. ISBN 9781483218779.
- McShane, E. J. (1983). Unified integration. Orlando: Academic Press.

=== as translator ===
- Courant, R. (1937), Differential and Integral Calculus, vol. I, translated by McShane, E. J. (2nd ed.), New York: Interscience, ISBN 978-4-87187-838-8
- Courant, R. (1936), Differential and Integral Calculus, vol. II, translated by McShane, E. J., New York: Interscience, ISBN 978-4-87187-835-7
