= Elizabeth Jane Lloyd =

British artist and teacher (1928-1995)

- Born: 14 July 1928; London, England
- Died: 20 October 1995 (aged 67); London, England
- Education: Chelsea School of Art; Royal College of Art
- Spouse: Jeff Hoare (m. 1952–1995, her death)

Elizabeth Jane Lloyd (14 July 1928 – 20 October 1995) was a British artist and teacher. As an artist she worked in oils and watercolours, produced murals and also painted film sets.

== Biography ==
Lloyd was born in London to a well-connected artistic family, her mother was a painter and several relatives were architects, including her grandfather, William Curtis Green. Lloyd attended Queen Anne's School in Caversham and began studying painting at the Chelsea School of Art in 1946. She then studied mural design at the Royal College of Art, RCA, from 1949 to 1952. Before she had even graduated from the RCA Lloyd completed several public and private mural commissions, notably for the Chelsea Pensioners' Rest Hall, The Tote Investors' Board Room and for the National Farmers Union. A mural at Dundee University was completed later. Lloyd had her first solo exhibition at the Royal Festival Hall in 1953 and also began exhibiting with the Royal Academy the same year. From 1953 to 1955, Lloyd taught at the Crown Manor Boys' Club in Hoxton.

After a break to raise her children, Lloyd returned to teaching in 1962 at the City Literary Institute in central London. In 1965 she took a role teaching the foundation course at Central St. Martins College of Art and Design. Lloyd would continue teaching at Central St Martin's for the rest of her life. Shortly before her sudden death she had been appointed head of their Portfolio Preparation Course. Lloyd greatly enjoyed teaching and held visiting lecturer posts at Aberdeen University, Stirling University and the University of Surrey. Between 1960 and 1988 Lloyd was a regular guest lecturer at both the Yehudi Menuhin School and the Interlocken International Centre in New Hampshire. She also taught at the Chelsea Physic Garden in London and at the Krishnamurti Schools in both England and India. India was a great influence on her work and she often used a richly coloured palette to create informal scenes and still lives in, apparently strong sunlight.

During the 1980s, Lloyd undertook work on several film productions, doing scene painting for Chariots of Fire, Flash Gordon, Breaking Glass and The Mirror Crack'd. In the 1990s, she published two books, including one on the art of making garlands and wreaths. Lloyd had several solo exhibitions at the Barbican Centre in London and had a solo exhibition at the Austin/Desmond Gallery in London in 1990 and examples of her paintings are held by the Nuffield Foundation and the Gulbenkian Trust.

In 1952, Lloyd married Jeff Hoare, a fellow artist who she had met while they were both students at the Chelsea School of Art. Together they had four children, the youngest of whom also became an artist. Father and daughter had a joint exhibition in 1999.

== Published works ==
- Enchanted Circles (1991)
- Still-life Watercolour Painting (1994)
