= Ralph Henstock =

British mathematician (1923–2007)

Ralph Henstock (2 June 1923 – 17 January 2007) was an English mathematician and author. As an Integration theorist, he is notable for Henstock–Kurzweil integral. Henstock brought the theory to a highly developed stage without ever having encountered Jaroslav Kurzweil's 1957 paper on the subject.

== Early life ==
Henstock was born in the coal-mining village of Newstead, Nottinghamshire, the only child of mineworker and former coalminer William Henstock and Mary Ellen Henstock (née Bancroft). On the Henstock side he was descended from 17th century Flemish immigrants called Hemstok.

Because of his early academic promise it was expected that Henstock would attend the University of Nottingham where his father and uncle had received technical education, but as it turned out he won scholarships which enabled him to study mathematics at St John's College, Cambridge from October 1941 until November 1943, when he was sent for war service to the Ministry of Supply's department of Statistical Method and Quality Control in London.

This work did not satisfy him, so he enrolled at Birkbeck College, London where he joined the weekly seminar of Professor Paul Dienes which was then a focus for mathematical activity in London. Henstock wanted to study divergent series but Dienes prevailed upon him to get involved in the theory of integration, thereby setting him on course for his life's work.

A devoted Methodist, the lasting impression he made was one of gentle sincerity and amiability. Henstock married Marjorie Jardine in 1949. Their son John was born 10 July 1952. Ralph Henstock died on 17 January 2007 after a short illness.

== Work ==
Henstock was awarded the Cambridge B.A. in 1944 and began research for the PhD in Birkbeck College, London, under the supervision of Paul Dienes. His PhD thesis, entitled Interval Functions and their Integrals, was submitted in December 1948. His Ph.D. examiners were Burkill and H. Kestelman. In 1947 he returned briefly to Cambridge to complete the undergraduate mathematical studies which had been truncated by his Ministry of Supply work.

Most of Henstock's work was concerned with integration. From initial studies of the Burkill and Ward integrals he formulated an integration process whereby the domain of integration is suitably partitioned for Riemann sums to approximate the integral of a function. His methods led to an integral on the real line that was very similar in construction and simplicity to the Riemann integral but which included the Lebesgue integral and, in addition, allowed non-absolute convergence.

These ideas were developed from the late 1950s. Independently, Jaroslav Kurzweil developed a similar Riemann-type integral on the real line. The resulting integral is now known as the Henstock-Kurzweil integral. On the real line it is equivalent to the Denjoy-Perron integral, but has a simpler definition.

In the following decades, Henstock developed extensively the distinctive features of his theory, inventing the concepts of division spaces or integration bases to demonstrate in general settings the properties and characteristics of mathematical integration. His theory provides a unified approach to non-absolute integral, as different kinds of Henstock integral, choosing an appropriate integration basis (division space, in Henstock's own terminology). It has been used in differential and integral equations, harmonic analysis, probability theory and Feynman integration. Numerous monographs and texts have appeared since 1980 and there have been several conferences devoted to the theory. It has been taught in standard courses in mathematical analysis.

Henstock was author of 46 journal papers in the period 1946 to 2006. He published four books on analysis (Theory of Integration, 1963; Linear Analysis, 1967; Lectures on the Theory of Integration, 1988; and The General Theory of Integration, 1991). He wrote 171 reviews for MathSciNet. In 1994 he was awarded the Andy Prize of the XVIII Summer Symposium in Real Analysis. His academic career began as Assistant Lecturer, Bedford College for Women, 1947–48; then Assistant Lecturer at Birkbeck, 1948–51; Lecturer, Queen's University Belfast, 1951–56; Lecturer, Bristol University, 1956–60; Senior Lecturer and Reader, Queen's University Belfast, 1960–64; Reader, Lancaster University, 1964–70; Chair of Pure Mathematics, New University of Ulster, 1970–88; and Leverhulme Fellow 1988–91.

=== List of publications of Ralph Henstock ===
Much of Henstock's earliest work was published by the Journal of the London Mathematical Society. These were "On interval functions and their integrals" I (21, 1946) and II (23, 1948); "The efficiency of matrices for Taylor series" (22, 1947); "The efficiency of matrices for bounded sequences" (25, 1950); "The efficiency of convergence factors for functions of a continuous real variable" (30, 1955); "A new description of the Ward integral" (35 1960); and "The integrability of functions of interval functions" (39 1964).

His works, published in Proceedings of the London Mathematical Society, were "Density integration" (53, 1951); "On the measure of sum sets (I) The theorems of Brunn, Minkowski, and Lusternik, (with A.M. McBeath)" ([3] 3, 1953); "Linear functions with domain a real countably infinite dimensional space" ([3] 5, 1955); "Linear and bilinear functions with domain contained in a real countably infinite dimensional space" ([3] 6, 1956); "The use of convergence factors in Ward integration" ([3] 10, 1960); "The equivalence of generalized forms of the Ward, variational, Denjoy-Stieltjes, and Perron-Stieltjes integrals" ([3] 10, 1960); "N-variation and N-variational integrals of set functions" ([3] 11, 1961); "Definitions of Riemann type of the variational integrals" ([3] 11, 1961); "Difference-sets and the Banach–Steinhaus theorem" ([3] 13, 1963); "Generalized integrals of vector-valued functions ([3] 19 1969)

Additional publications:

1. Sets of uniqueness for trigonometric series and integrals, Proceedings of the Cambridge Philosophical Society 46 (1950) 538–548.
2. On Ward's Perron-Stieltjes integral, Canadian Journal of Mathematics 9 (1957) 96–109.
3. The summation by convergence factors of Laplace-Stieltjes integrals outside their half plane of convergence, Mathematische Zeitschrift 67 (1957) 10–31.
4. Theory of Integration, Butterworths, London, 1962.
5. Tauberian theorems for integrals, Canadian Journal of Mathematics 15 (1963) 433–439.
6. Majorants in variational integration, Canadian Journal of Mathematics 18 (1966) 49–74.
7. A Riemann-type integral of Lebesgue power, Canadian Journal of Mathematics 20 (1968) 79–87.
8. Linear Analysis, Butterworths, London, 1967.
9. Integration by parts, Aequationes Mathematicae 9 (1973) 1–18.
10. The N-variational integral and the Schwartz distributions III, Journal of the London Mathematical Society (2) 6 (1973) 693–700.
11. Integration in product spaces, including Wiener and Feynman integration, Proceedings of the London Mathematical Society (3) 27 (1973) 317–344.
12. Additivity and the Lebesgue limit theorems, The Greek Mathematical Society C. Carathéodory Symposium, 1973, 223–241 (Proceedings published 1974).
13. Integration, variation and differentiation in division spaces, Proceedings of the Royal Irish Academy, Series A (10) 78 (1978) 69–85.
14. The variation on the real line, Proceedings of the Royal Irish Academy, Series A (1) 79 (1979) 1–10.
15. Generalized Riemann integration and an intrinsic topology, Canadian Journal of Mathematics 32 (1980) 395–413.
16. Division spaces, vector-valued functions and backwards martingales, Proceedings of the Royal Irish Academy, Series A (2) 80 (1980) 217–232.
17. Density integration and Walsh functions, Bulletin of the Malaysian Mathematical Society (2) 5 (1982) 1–19.
18. A problem in two-dimensional integration, Journal of the Australian Mathematical Society, (Series A) 35 (1983) 386–404.
19. The Lebesgue syndrome, Real Analysis Exchange 9 (1983–84) 96–110.
20. The reversal of power and integration, Bulletin of the Institute of Mathematics and its Applications 22 (1986) 60–61.
21. Lectures on the Theory of Integration, World Scientific, Singapore, 1988.
22. A short history of integration theory, South East Asian Bulletin of Mathematics 12 (1988) 75–95.
23. Introduction to the new integrals, New integrals (Coleraine, 1988), 7–9, Lecture Notes in Mathematics, 1419, Springer-Verlag, Berlin, 1990.
24. Integration in infinite-dimensional spaces, New integrals (Coleraine, 1988), 54–65, Lecture Notes in Mathematics, 1419, Springer-Verlag, Berlin, 1990.
25. Stochastic and other functional integrals, Real Analysis Exchange 16 (1990/91) 460–470.
26. The General Theory of Integration, Oxford Mathematical Monographs, Clarendon Press, Oxford, 1991.
27. The integral over product spaces and Wiener's formula, Real Analysis Exchange 17 (1991/92) 737–744.
28. Infinite decimals, Mathematica Japonica 38 (1993) 203–209.
29. Measure spaces and division spaces, Real Analysis Exchange 19 (1993/94) 121–128.
30. The construction of path integrals, Mathematica Japonica 39 (1994) 15–18.
31. Gauge or Kurzweil-Henstock integration. Proceedings of the Prague Mathematical Conference 1996, 117–122, Icaris, Prague, 1997.
32. De La Vallée Poussin's contributions to integration theory, Charles-Jean de La Vallée Poussin Oeuvres Scientifiques, Volume II, Académie Royale de Belgique, Circolo Matematico di Palermo, 2001, 3–16.
33. Partitioning infinite-dimensional spaces for generalized Riemann integration, (with P. Muldowney and V.A. Skvortsov) Bulletin of the London Mathematical Society, 38 (2006) 795–803.

=== Review of Henstock's work ===
The journal Scientiae Mathematicae Japonicae published a special commemorative issue in Henstock’s honor, January 2008. The above article is copied, with permission, from Real Analysis Exchange and from Scientiae Mathematicae Japonicae. The latter contains the following review of Henstock's work:

1. Ralph Henstock, an obituary, by P. Bullen.

2. Ralph Henstock: research summary, by E. Talvila.

3. The integral à la Henstock, by Peng Yee Lee.

4. The natural integral on the real line, by B. Thomson.

5. Ralph Henstock's influence on integration theory, by W.F. Pfeffer.

6. Henstock on random variation, by P. Muldowney.

7. Henstock integral in harmonic analysis, by V.A. Skvortsov.

8. Convergences on the Henstock-Kurzweil integral, by S. Nakanishi.

== See also ==
- Partition of an interval
- Integrable function
