= Peng Yee Lee =

Singaporean mathematician

- Born: 1938 (age 87–88)

Academic background
- Education: Queens University of Belfast
- Academic advisor: Ralph Henstock

Chinese name
- Chinese: 李秉彝
- Hanyu Pinyin: Lǐ Bǐngyí

Peng Yee Lee (born 1938) is a Singaporean mathematician and mathematics educator. Lee is an associate professor of mathematics at the National Institute of Education in Singapore. He is a former president of the Southeast Asian Mathematical Society, a former vice president of the International Commission on Mathematical Instruction, and a former president of the Association of Mathematics Educators of Singapore.

In mathematics, Lee's work is in analysis focusing on integration theory.

== Early life and education ==
Lee received his PhD from Queens University of Belfast (UK) in 1965, under the direction of Ralph Henstock.

== Career ==
Lee has taught at the University of Malawi (1965–67), the University of Auckland (1967–71), Nanyang University (1971–81), the National University of Singapore (1981–94), and the National Institute of Education (NIE) in Nanyang Technological University (1994–2013).

Lee was a president of the Southeast Asian Mathematical Society in 1981 and 1982, and vice president of the International Commission on Mathematical Instruction (ICMI) from 1987 to 1990 and from 1991 to 1994. He was President of the Association of Mathematics Educators in Singapore in 2000 and 2001.

In 2012, he became one of the inaugural Fellows of the American Mathematical Society.

== Contributions ==
Lee worked for more than 40 years to promote the development of mathematics and mathematics education in Southeast Asia and in China. He trained a significant number of mathematicians from these regions, including those from Singapore, Indonesia and the Philippines. Lee has published about 100 research papers and written several books on analysis and mathematics education.

Lee contributed to the development of Singapore math, a teaching method and mathematics curriculum that focus on problem solving and heuristic model drawing, which originated in Singapore in the 1980s.

== Selected works ==
- Peng Yee Lee (1989) Lanzhou Lectures on Henstock Integration, World Scientific. ISBN 9971-50-891-5.
- Peng Yee Lee and Redolf Výborný (2000) Integral: an easy approach after Kurzweil and Henstock, Cambridge University Press. ISBN 0-521-77968-5.
- Peng Yee Lee (2006) Mathematics for Teaching or Mathematics for Teachers? Guest Editorial, The Mathematics Educator, Vol. 16, No. 2, 2–3.
- Peng Yee Lee, Jan de Lange, and William Schmidt (2006) What are PISA and TIMSS? What do they tell us? International Congress of Mathematicians. Vol. III, 1663–1672, European Mathematical Society, Zürich.
- Bin Xiong and Peng Yee Lee (2007) Mathematical Olympiad in China: Problems and Solutions, East China Normal University Press.
- Lee, P. Y, “Sixty years of mathematics syllabi and textbooks in Singapore (1945-2005)”. Paper presented for The First International Conference on Mathematics Curriculum at the University of Chicago, 2005.
