= Dienes (surname) =

Dienes, Dénes, Gyenis, or Gyenes is a Hungarian surname. The name can be found within Hungary, its neighboring regions, and across the wider Hungarian diaspora. It is the Hungarian variant of Dennis, which derives its meaning from Dionysus, the Thracian god of wine. Notable people with the surname include:

- András Dienes, Hungarian footballer
- Emanuel Gyenes, Romanian rally driver
- Katherine Dienes, New Zealand-born organist, conductor and composer working in England
- Paul Dienes, Hungarian mathematician
- Zoltán Pál Dienes, Hungarian mathematician
