= Jeff Hoare =

British artist and teacher (1923–2019)

Jeff Hoare (1 October 1923 – October 2019) was a British artist and teacher.

== Biography ==
Hoare was born in Salisbury in October 1923, and at an early age moved to Ampleforth when his father was appointed School Clerk. Hoare served in the Royal Navy 1942–1946 and on release began studying at Chelsea School of Art. Contemporaries included Elizabeth Frink, Anthony Rossiter and Brian Yates; Hoare studied under Robert Medley and Ceri Richards. Hoare then did a year printmaking at the Royal College of Art, followed by a diploma in art education and philosophy at the University of Swansea. He began exhibiting at the Royal Academy in 1957.

At the time, practising artists taught part-time between painting full-time professionally. Hoare taught part-time in several places: Dagenham County High School (1951–1955), Wandsworth School, The City Literary Institute, Brighton College of Art (1958–1963), Central School of Art and Design(1963-1974), Camberwell School of Art, Cambridge College of Art (1976-1984), Morley College (1981). Hoare was invited as Visiting Professor and then as artist in residence at the University of Southern Illinois in 1967 and 1968, respectively, and subsequently at the University of Arizona in 1979. Hoare was a regular guest artist and tutor at the Interlocken International Centre in New Hampshire. Hoare was a Grenada visiting Fellow at the University of Lancaster in 1969–70.

Commissions have included murals at the Cordwainers College (1958), the Regent Hotel Plymouth (1966), paintings for Shell-Mex Headquarters (1962), murals for the Department of Environmental Sciences, County College, Lancaster (1970); the University of Lancaster (1971); Berman and Kahlmbach, New York (1971); the University of Surrey. Hoare painted dancers in the Carnival for the Birds RSPB Charity event at the Royal Opera House (1991) and designed sets for Brecht's Caucasian Chalk Circle

Hoare has had many solo exhibitions, including at the Piccadilly Gallery, London; the Maddison Gallery, New York; the Marjorie Parr Gallery, London; the New Bertha Schaeffer Gallery, New York, Galleri Birgerjarl, Stockholm; Arras Gallery New York. Hoare has also participated in group exhibitions: the Royal Festival Hall (1952); Springfield Art Museum, Illinois; Abbot Hall Art Gallery, Kendal. In 2010 he painted an elephant for the Elephant Parade in London and the year following, a crocodile for Jungle Family, at the Edinburgh Festival.

Greatly influenced by his early exposure to American artists, Hoare moved from more traditional techniques of drawing and painting to creating paintings in the sea.

In 1952 Hoare married Elizabeth Jane Lloyd, a fellow artist he met when they both studied at Chelsea School of Art. One daughter is also an artist, with whom he had a joint exhibition.

In 2010 Hoare was awarded the Bletchley Park and Outstation War Veterans medals for his wartime work in the navy.

He died in October 2019 at the age of 96.
