= Annette Allcock =

English artist

- Born: Annette Rookledge; 28 November 1923; Bromley, England
- Died: 2 May 2001 (aged 77); Somerset, England
- Education: West of England College of Art
- Known for: Painting, book illustration

Annette Allcock née Rookledge, (28 November 1923 – 2 May 2001) was a British artist and illustrator.

== Biography ==
Allcock was born in Bromley, Kent in November 1923. After a private education, she attended the West of England College of Art between 1941 and 1943. She subsequently attended other art schools on a part-time basis. After World War II ended, Allcock worked as a film animator producing cinema adverts and short pieces for the Ministry of Information. Influenced by Stanley Spencer, who was a distant relative and who she frequently visited at his home in Cookham, Allcock became a full-time artist and concentrated on painting portraits of children. After raising her own children, she returned to work by designing charity greeting cards from home. She also illustrated a number of children's books for the Methuen publishing house. Between 1978 and 1986, Allcock was a regular exhibitor at the Royal Academy Summer Exhibitions in London. Allcock also exhibited with the Royal West of England Academy and at the Beaux Arts Gallery in Bath and elsewhere in Britain. She died in Somerset in May 2001 at the age of 77.
