= Paul Dienes =

Hungarian mathematician and poet

Paul Dienes (Hungarian: Dienes Pál. November 24, 1882 Tokaj, Austria-Hungary – March 23, 1952) was a Hungarian mathematician, philosopher, linguist and poet.

Born in to a wealthy and aristocratic Protestant family, he married Valéria Geiger (1879–1978) in December 1905. They had two sons, Gedeon Dienes (1914) and Zoltan Paul Dienes (1916). Following their divorce, he married Sari Dienes in 1922. He was an active member of the Galileo Circle along with his brother László Dienes.

Dienes joined the Hungarian Communist Party during the establishment of the Hungarian Soviet Republic and in 1919 was appointed the political commissar of the University of Budapest. After the fall of the Soviet Republic he fled to Vienna and was later invited to the United Kingdom.

From 1921 to 1923 he lectured at University College, Swansea, where his students included Evan Tom Davies. From 1923 to 1948 he was Professor of Mathematics at Birkbeck College, London, where his students included Ralph Henstock and Abraham Robinson.

== Selected works ==
- Leçons sur les singularités des fonctions analytiques, professées à l'Université de Budapest par Paul Dienes. 1913.
- Taylor series; an introduction to the theory of functions of a complex variable. 1931. 2nd edition. 1957.
