= Alec Coppen =

British psychiatrist (1923–2019)

Alec James Coppen (29 January 1923 – 15 March 2019) was a British psychiatrist. He was given The Pioneers in Psychopharmacology Award in year 2000 by the Collegium Internationale Neuro Psychopharmacologicum.

Coppen was born in London, England in January 1923. He received numerous awards, both in the UK and abroad. After army service in World War II, he studied medicine at Bristol University and at the Institute of Psychiatry in London. Later he was appointed to the Medical Research Council's Neuropsychiatric Research Unit in Epsom, Surrey, England. He is perhaps best known for the introduction of Serotonin theory of depression. He followed this by pursuing investigations into free and total tryptophan, post-mortem brain studies of depressed suicides and studies into the platelet transport of serotonin. It is fair to state the introduction of SSRI antidepressants is due to these studies.

He was very impressed by the early work of Mogens Schou in the use of lithium in the maintenance treatment of unipolar and bipolar affective disorder, and carried out the first prospective double blind trial, which showed that lithium was very effective in the treatment of both conditions.

He worked on folic acid in depression from 1970, and consistently found low plasma and red cell folate in patients with severe depression. He also showed that a folic acid supplement improved the prophylactic response to lithium. Antidepressant drugs are relatively weak therapeutic agents, only 60% of patients respond to an antidepressant compared with 40% on placebo. Combining fluoxetine with 0.5 mg of folic acid 90% of women patients responded to treatment, an observation that may have massive implications for the treatment of depression.

== Personal life ==
In 1952, Coppen married Gunhild Andersson, who came from Sweden. They had one child Michael, also a doctor. Gunhild died on 26 May 2007, of a sudden illness.

He died on 15 March 2019 at the age of 96.
