= McShane integral =

Integral in integration theory

In the branch of mathematics known as integration theory, the McShane integral, created by Edward J. McShane, is a modification of the Henstock-Kurzweil integral. The McShane integral is equivalent to the Lebesgue integral.

== Definition ==
=== Free tagged partition ===
Given a closed interval [a, b] of the real line, a free tagged partition $P$ of $[a,b]$ is a set

$$\{(t_i, [a_{i-1}, a_i]) : 1 \leq i \leq n  \}$$

where

$$a = a_0 < a_1 < \dots < a_n = b$$

and each tag $t_i \in [a, b]$.

The fact that the tags are allowed to be outside the subintervals is why the partition is called free. It's also the only difference between the definitions of the Henstock-Kurzweil integral and the McShane integral.

For a function $f : [a,b] \to \mathbb{R}$ and a free tagged partition $P$, define $S(f, P) = \sum_{i = 1}^n f(t_i) (a_i - a_{i-1}).$

=== Gauge ===
A positive function $\delta : [a, b] \to (0, +\infty)$ is called a gauge in this context.

We say that a free tagged partition $P$ is $\delta$-fine if for all $i = 1,2, \dots, n,$

$$[a_{i-1}, a_i] \subseteq [t_i - \delta(t_i), t_i + \delta(t_i)].$$

Intuitively, the gauge controls the widths of the subintervals. Like with the Henstock-Kurzweil integral, this provides flexibility (especially near problematic points) not given by the Riemann integral.

=== McShane integral ===
The value $\int_a^b f$ is the McShane integral of $f : [a,b] \to \mathbb{R}$ if for every $\varepsilon > 0$ we can find a gauge $\delta$ such that for all $\delta$-fine free tagged partitions $P$ of $[a,b]$,

$$\left |\int_a^bf - S(f, P) \right| < \varepsilon.$$

== Examples ==
It's clear that if a function $f : [a,b] \to \mathbb{R}$ is integrable according to the McShane definition, then $f$ is also Henstock-Kurzweil integrable. Both integrals coincide in the regard of its uniqueness.

In order to illustrate the above definition we analyse the McShane integrability of the functions described in the following examples, which are already known as Henstock-Kurzweil integrable (see the paragraph 3 of the site of this Wikipedia "Henstock-Kurzweil integral").

=== Example 1 ===
Let $f : [a,b] \to \mathbb{R}$ be such that $f(a)=f(b)=0$ and $f(x)=1$ if $x\in]a,b[.$

As is well known, this function is Riemann integrable and the correspondent integral is equal to $b-a.$ We will show that this $f$ is also McShane integrable and that its integral assumes the same value.

For that purpose, for a given $\varepsilon>0$, let's choose the gauge $\delta(t)$ such that $\delta(a)=\delta(b)=\varepsilon/4$ and $\delta(t)=b-a$ if $t\in]a,b[.$

Any free tagged partition $P=\{(t_i, [a_{i-1}, a_i]) : i=1,...,n\}$ of $[a,b]$ can be decomposed into sequences like

$(a,[x_{i_j-1},x_{i_j}])$, for $j=1,...,\lambda$,

$(b,[x_{i_k-1},x_{i_k}])$, for $k=1,...,\mu$, and

$(t_{i_r},[x_{i_r-1},x_{i_r}])$, where $r=1,...,\nu$, such that $t_{i_r}\in]a,b[$ $(\lambda+\mu+\nu=n).$

This way, we have the Riemann sum

$S(f, P) = \sum_{r=1}^\nu \displaystyle(x_{i_r}-x_{i_r-1})$

and by consequence

$|S(P,f)-(b-a)|=\textstyle \sum_{j=1}^\lambda \displaystyle(x_{i_j}-x_{i_j-1})+\textstyle \sum_{k=1}^\mu \displaystyle(x_{i_k}-x_{i_k-1}).$

Therefore if $P$ is a free tagged $\delta$-fine partition we have

$[x_{i_j-1},x_{i_j}]\subset[a-\delta(a),a+\delta(a)]$, for every $j=1,...,\lambda$, and

$[x_{i_k-1},x_{i_k}]\subset[b-\delta(b),b+\delta(b)]$, for every $k=1,...,\mu$.

Since each one of those intervals do not overlap the interior of all the remaining, we obtain

$|S(P,f)-(b-a)| <2\delta(a)+2\delta(b)=\frac{\varepsilon}{2}+\frac{\varepsilon}{2}=\varepsilon.$

Thus $f$ is McShane integrable and

$\int_a^b f=b-a.$

The next example proves the existence of a distinction between Riemann and McShane integrals.

=== Example 2 ===
Let $d:[a,b]\rightarrow\mathbb{R}$ the well known Dirichlet's function given by

$$d(x) = \begin{cases} 1, & \text{if }x\text{ is rational,} \\0, & \text{if }x\text{ is irrational,} \end{cases}$$

which one knows to be not Riemann integrable. We will show that $d$ is integrable in the McShane sense and that its integral is zero.

Denoting by $\{r_1,r_2,...,r_n,...\}$ the set of all rational numbers of the interval $[a,b]$, for any $\varepsilon>0$ let's formulate the following gauge

$$\delta(x) = \begin{cases} \varepsilon2^{-n-1}, & \text{if }x=r_n\text{ and } n=1,2,...,\\1, & \text{if }x\text{ is irrational.} \end{cases}$$

For any $\delta$-fine free tagged partition $P=\{(t_i,[x_{i-1},x_i]):i=1,...,n\}$ consider its Riemann sum

$S(P,f)=\textstyle \sum_{i=1}^n \displaystyle f(t_i)(x_i-x_{i-1})$.

Taking into account that $f(t_i)=0$ whenever $t_i$ is irrational, we can exclude in the sequence of ordered pairs which constitute $P$, the pairs $(t_i,[x_{i-1},x_i])$ where $t_i$ is irrational. The remainder are subsequences of the type $(r_k,[x_{i_1-1},x_{i_1}]),...,(r_k,[x_{i_k-1},x_{i_k}])$ such that $[x_{i_j-1},x_{i_j}]\subset [r_k-\delta(r_k),r_k+\delta(r_k)]$, $j=1,...,k.$ Since each one of those intervals do not overlap the interior of the remaining, each one of these sequences gives rise in the Riemann sum to subsums of the type

$\textstyle \sum_{j=1}^k \displaystyle f(r_k)(x_{i_j}-x_{i_j-1})=\textstyle \sum_{j=1}^k \displaystyle (x_{i_j}-x_{i_j-1})\leq2\delta(r_k)=\frac{\varepsilon}{2^n}$.

Thus $0\leq S(P,f)<\textstyle \sum_{n\geq1} \displaystyle \varepsilon/2^n=\varepsilon$, which proves that the Dirichlet's function is McShane integrable and that

$\int_a^b d=0.$

== Relationship with Derivatives ==
For real functions defined on an interval $[a,b]$, both Henstock-Kurzweil and McShane integrals satisfy the elementary properties enumerated below, where by $\int_{a}^{b} f$ we denote indistinctly the value of anyone of those integrals.

1. If $f$ is integrable on $[a,b]$ then $f$ is integrable on each subinterval of $[a,b]$.
2. If $f$ is integrable on $[a,c]$ and $[c,b]$ then $f$ is integrable on $[a,b]$ and $\int_{a}^{c} f+\int_{c}^{b} f=\int_{a}^{b} f$.
3. If $f$ is continuous on $[a,b]$ then $f$ is integrable on $[a,b]$.
4. If $f$ is monotonous on $[a,b]$ then $f$ is integrable on $[a,b]$.
5. Let $\phi:[a,b]\rightarrow[\alpha,\beta]$ be a differentiable and strictly monotonous function. Then $f:[\alpha,\beta]\rightarrow\mathbb{R}$ is integrable on $[\alpha,\beta]$ if and only if $(f\circ\phi)|\phi'|$ is integrable on $[a,b]$. In such case $\int_{a}^{b} (f\circ\phi)|\phi'|=\int_{\alpha}^{\beta} f$.
6. If $f$ is integrable on $[a,b]$ then $kf$ is integrable on $[a,b]$ and $\int_{a}^{b}kf=k\int_{a}^{b}f$, for every $k\in \mathbb{R}$.
7. Let $f$ and $g$ be integrable on $[a,b]$. Then:
  - $f+g$ is integrable on $[a,b]$ and $\int_{a}^{b} (f+g)=\int_{a}^{b} f+\int_{a}^{b} g$.
  - $f\leq g$ on $\left[ a,b\right]$$\Rightarrow \int_{a}^{b}f\leq \int_{a}^{b}g$.

With respect to the integrals mentioned above, the proofs of these properties are identical excepting slight variations inherent to the differences of the correspondent definitions (see Washek Pfeffer [Sec. 6.1]).

This way a certain parallelism between the two integrals is observed. However an imperceptible rupture occurs when other properties are analysed, such as the absolute integrability and the integrability of the derivatives of integrable differentiable functions.

On this matter the following theorems hold (see [Prop.2.2.3 e Th. 6.1.2]).

=== Theorem 1 (on the absolute integrability of the McShane integral) ===
If $f:[a,b]\rightarrow\mathbb{R}$ is McShane integrable on $[a,b]$ then $|f|$ is also McShane integrable on $[a,b]$ and$|\int_{a}^{b} f|\leq\int_{a}^{b} |f|$.

=== Theorem 2 (fundamental theorem of Henstock-Kurzweil integral) ===
If $F:[a,b]\rightarrow\mathbb{R}$ is differentiable on $[a,b]$, then $F'$ is Henstock-Kurzweil integrable on $[a,b]$ and$\int_{a}^{b} F'=F(b)-F(a)$.

In order to illustrate these theorems we analyse the following example based upon Example 2.4.12.

=== Example 3 ===
Let's consider the function:

$$F(x) = \begin{cases} x^2\cos(\pi/x^2), & \text{if }x\neq0, \\ 0, & \text{if }x=0. \end{cases}$$

$F$ is obviously differentiable at any $x\neq0$ and differentiable, as well, at $x=0$, since $\lim_{x \to 0}\left ( \frac{F(x)}{x} \right )=\lim_{x \to 0}\left ( x\cos\frac{\pi}{x^2} \right )=0$.

Moreover

$$F'(x) = \begin{cases} 2x\cos(\pi/x^2)+ \frac{2\pi}{x}\sin(\pi/x^2) , & \text{if }x\neq0, \\ 0, & \text{if }x=0. \end{cases}$$

As the function

$$h(x) = \begin{cases} 2x\cos(\pi/x^2), & \text{if }x\neq0, \\ 0, & \text{if }x=0, \end{cases}$$

is continuous and, by the Theorem 2, the function $F'(x)$ is Henstock-Kurzweil integrable on $[0,1],$ then by the properties 6 and 7, the same holds to the function

$$g_0(x) = \begin{cases} \frac{1}{x} \sin(\pi/x^2), & \text{if }x\neq0, \\ 0, & \text{if }x=0. \end{cases}$$

But the function

$$g(x)=|g_0(x) |= \begin{cases} \frac{1}{x} |\sin(\pi/x^2)|, & \text{if }x\neq0, \\ 0, & \text{if }x=0, \end{cases}$$

is not integrable on $[0,1]$ for none of the mentioned integrals.

In fact, otherwise, denoting by $\int_{0}^{1} g(x) dx$ anyone of such integrals, we should have necessarily $\int_{0}^{1} g(x) dx\geq\int_{1/\sqrt{n}}^{1} \frac{1}{x} |\sin(\pi/x^2)| dx,$ for any positive integer $n$. Then through the change of variable $x=1/\sqrt{t}$, we should obtain taking into account the property 5:

$\int_{1/\sqrt{n}}^{1} \frac{1}{x} |\sin(\pi/x^2)| dx=\frac{1}{2}\int_{1}^{n} \frac{1}{t} |\sin(\pi t)| dt =\frac{1}{2}\sum_{k=2}^n\int_{k-1}^{k} \frac{1}{t} |\sin(\pi t)| dt\geq$

$\geq\frac{1}{2}\sum_{k=2}^n\frac{1}{k} \int_{k-1}^{k} |\sin(\pi t)| dt=\frac{1}{\pi} \sum_{k=2}^n\frac{1}{k}$.

As $n$ is an arbitrary positive integer and $\lim_{n \to \infty}\sum_{k=2}^N\frac{1}{k}=+\infty$, we obtain a contradiction.

From this example we are able to conclude the following relevant consequences:

- I) Theorem 1 is no longer true for Henstock-Kurzweil integral since $g_0$ is Henstock-Kurzweil integrable and $g$ is not.
- II) Theorem 2 does not hold for McShane integral. Otherwise $F'$ should be McShane integrable as well as $g_0$ and by Theorem 1, as $g$, which is absurd.
- III) $F'$ is, this way, an example of a Henstock-Kurzweil integrable function which is not McShane integrable. That is, the class of McShane integrable functions is a strict subclass of the Henstock-Kurzweil integrable functions.

== Relationship with Lebesgue Integral ==
The more surprising result of the McShane integral is stated in the following theorem, already announced in the introduction.

=== Theorem 3 ===
Let $f:[a,b]\rightarrow\mathbb{R}$. Then

$f$ is McShane integrable $\Leftrightarrow$ $f$ is Lebesgue integrable.

The correspondent integrals coincide.

This fact enables to conclude that with the McShane integral one formulates a kind of unification of the integration theory around Riemann sums, which, after all, constitute the origin of that theory.

So far is not known an immediate proof of such theorem.

In Washek Pfeffer [Ch. 4] it is stated through the development of the theory of McShane integral, including measure theory, in relationship with already known properties of Lebesgue integral. In Charles Swartz that same equivalence is proved in Appendix 4.

Furtherly to the book by Russel Gordon [Ch. 10], on this subject we call the attention of the reader also to the works by Robert McLeod [Ch. 8] and Douglas Kurtz together with Charles W. Swartz.

Another perspective of the McShane integral is that it can be looked as new formulation of the Lebesgue integral without using Measure Theory, as alternative to the courses of Frigyes Riesz and Bela Sz. Nagy [Ch.II] or Serge Lang [Ch.X, §4 Appendix] (see also).

== See also ==
- Henstock-Kurzweil integral
