= Henstock–Kurzweil integral =

Generalization of the Riemann integral

In mathematics, the Henstock–Kurzweil integral or generalized Riemann integral or gauge integral – also known as the (narrow) Denjoy integral (pronounced [dɑ̃ʒwa]), Luzin integral or Perron integral, but not to be confused with the more general wide Denjoy integral – is one of a number of inequivalent definitions of the integral of a function. It is a generalization of the Riemann integral, and in some situations is more general than the Lebesgue integral. In particular, a function is Lebesgue integrable over a subset of $\R^n$ if and only if the function and its absolute value are Henstock–Kurzweil integrable.

This integral was first defined by Arnaud Denjoy (1912). Denjoy was interested in a definition that would allow one to integrate functions like:

$$f(x) = \frac{1}{x}\sin\left(\frac{1}{x^3}\right).$$

This function has a singularity at 0, and is not Lebesgue-integrable. However, it seems natural to calculate its integral except over the interval $[-\varepsilon, \delta]$ and then let $\varepsilon, \delta \rightarrow 0$.

Trying to create a general theory, Denjoy used transfinite induction over the possible types of singularities, which made the definition quite complicated. Other definitions were given by Nikolai Luzin (using variations on the notions of absolute continuity), and by Oskar Perron, who was interested in continuous major and minor functions. It took a while to understand that the Perron and Denjoy integrals are actually identical.

Later, in 1957, the Czech mathematician Jaroslav Kurzweil discovered a new definition of this integral, elegantly similar in nature to Riemann's original definition, which Kurzweil named the gauge integral. In 1961 Ralph Henstock independently introduced a similar integral that extended the theory, citing his investigations of Ward's extensions to the Perron integral. Due to these two important contributions it is now commonly known as the Henstock–Kurzweil integral. The simplicity of Kurzweil's definition made some educators advocate that this integral should replace the Riemann integral in introductory calculus courses.

== Definition ==
Following Bartle (2001), given a tagged partition $\mathcal{P}$ of $[a, b]$, that is,
$$a = u_0 < u_1 < \cdots < u_n = b$$
together with each subinterval's tag defined as a point
$$t_i \in [u_{i-1}, u_i],$$
we define the Riemann sum for a function $f \colon [a, b] \to \mathbb{R}$ to be
$$\sum_P f = \sum_{i = 1}^n f(t_i) \Delta u_i.$$
where $\Delta u_i := u_i - u_{i-1}.$ This is the summation of each subinterval's length ($\Delta u_i$) multiplied by the function evaluated at that subinterval's tag ($f(t_i)$).

Given a positive function
$$\delta \colon [a, b] \to (0, \infty),$$
which we call a gauge, we say a tagged partition P is $\delta$-fine if
$$(\forall i \in \{1, \dots, n\}) \ (\ [u_{i-1}, u_i] \subset [t_i-\delta(t_i), t_i + \delta (t_i)]).$$

We now define a number I to be the Henstock–Kurzweil integral of f if for every ε > 0 there exists a gauge $\delta$ such that whenever P is $\delta$-fine, we have
$$\left \vert I - \sum_P f \right \vert < \varepsilon.$$

If such an I exists, we say that f is Henstock–Kurzweil integrable on $[a, b]$.

Cousin's theorem states that for every gauge $\delta$, such a $\delta$-fine partition P does exist, so this condition cannot be satisfied vacuously. The Riemann integral can be regarded as the special case where we only allow constant gauges.

== Properties ==
Let $f: [a, b] \to \mathbb{R}$ be any function.

Given $a < c < b$, $f$ is Henstock–Kurzweil integrable on $[a, b]$ if and only if it is Henstock–Kurzweil integrable on both $[a, c]$ and $[c, b]$; in which case (Bartle 2001, 3.7),
$$\int_a^b f(x)\,dx = \int_a^c f(x)\,dx + \int_c^b f(x)\,dx.$$

Henstock–Kurzweil integrals are linear: given integrable functions $f$ and $g$ and real numbers $\alpha$ and $\beta$, the expression $\alpha f + \beta g$ is integrable (Bartle 2001, 3.1); for example,
$$\int_a^b \left(\alpha f(x) + \beta g(x)\right) dx = \alpha \int_a^bf(x)\,dx + \beta \int_a^b g(x)\,dx.$$

If f is Riemann or Lebesgue integrable, then it is also Henstock–Kurzweil integrable, and calculating that integral gives the same result by all three formulations. The important Hake's theorem (Bartle 2001, 12.8) states that
$$\int_a^b f(x)\,dx = \lim_{c\to b^-} \int_a^c f(x)\,dx$$

whenever either side of the equation exists, and likewise symmetrically for the lower integration bound. This means that if $f$ is "improperly Henstock–Kurzweil integrable", then it is properly Henstock–Kurzweil integrable; in particular, improper Riemann or Lebesgue integrals of types such as
$$\int_0^1 \frac{\sin(1/x)}x\,dx$$

are also proper Henstock–Kurzweil integrals. To study an "improper Henstock–Kurzweil integral" with finite bounds would not be meaningful. However, it does make sense to consider improper Henstock–Kurzweil integrals with infinite bounds such as
$$\int_a^{\infty} f(x)\,dx := \lim_{b\to\infty}\int_a^b f(x)\,dx.$$

For many types of functions the Henstock–Kurzweil integral is no more general than Lebesgue integral. For example, if f is bounded with compact support, the following are equivalent:

- f is Henstock–Kurzweil integrable,
- f is Lebesgue integrable,
- f is Lebesgue measurable.

In general, every Henstock–Kurzweil integrable function is measurable, and $f$ is Lebesgue integrable if and only if both $f$ and $| f |$ are Henstock–Kurzweil integrable. This means that the Henstock–Kurzweil integral can be thought of as a "non-absolutely convergent version of the Lebesgue integral". It also implies that the Henstock–Kurzweil integral satisfies appropriate versions of the monotone convergence theorem (without requiring the functions to be nonnegative) and dominated convergence theorem (where the condition of dominance is loosened to g(x) ≤ f_{n}(x) ≤ h(x) for some integrable g, h).

If $F$ is differentiable everywhere (or continuous everywhere and differentiable with countably many exceptions), the derivative $F'$ is Henstock–Kurzweil integrable, and its indefinite Henstock–Kurzweil integral is $F$. (Note that $F'$ need not be Lebesgue integrable.) In other words, we obtain a simpler and more satisfactory version of the second fundamental theorem of calculus: each differentiable function is, up to a constant, the integral of its derivative:
$$F(x)-F(a) = \int_a^x F'(t) \,dt.$$

Conversely, the Lebesgue differentiation theorem continues to hold for the Henstock–Kurzweil integral: if $f$ is Henstock–Kurzweil integrable on $[a, b]$, and

$$F(x) = \int_a^x f(t)\,dt,$$

then $F'(x) = f(x)$ almost everywhere in $[a, b]$ (in particular, $F$ is differentiable almost everywhere).

The space of all Henstock–Kurzweil-integrable functions is often endowed with the Alexiewicz norm, with respect to which it is barrelled but incomplete.

== Utility ==
The gauge integral has increased utility when compared to the Riemann Integral in that the gauge integral of any function $f: [a, b] \to \mathbb{R}$ which has a constant value c except possibly at a countable number of points $C = \{c_i: i \in \N\}$ can be calculated. Consider for example the piecewise function
$$f(t) = \begin{cases}
0, & \text{if } t \in [0,1] \text{ and rational,}\\
1, & \text{if } t \in [0,1] \text{ and irrational}
\end{cases}$$
which is equal to one minus the Dirichlet function on the interval.

This function is impossible to integrate using a Riemann integral because it is impossible to make intervals $[u_{i-1}, u_i]$ small enough to encapsulate the changing values of f(x) with the mapping nature of $\delta$-fine tagged partitions.

The value of the type of integral described above is equal to $c(b-a)$, where c is the constant value of the function, and a, b are the function's endpoints. To demonstrate this, let $\varepsilon > 0$ be given and let $D = \{(z_j, J_j): 1 \leq j \leq n\}$ be a $\delta$-fine tagged partition of $[0, 1]$ with tags $z_j$ and intervals $J_j$, and let $f(t)$ be the piecewise function described above. Consider that
$$\left|\sum f(z_j) l(J_j) - 1(1-0)\right| = \left|\sum [f(z_j)-1] l(J_j)\right|$$
where $l(J_j)$ represents the length of interval $J_j$. Note this equivalence is established because the summation of the consecutive differences in length of all intervals $J_j$ is equal to the length of the interval (or $(1-0)$).

By the definition of the gauge integral, we want to show that the above equation is less than any given $\varepsilon$. This produces two cases:

Case 1: $z_j \notin C$ (All tags of $D$ are irrational):

If none of the tags of the tagged partition $D$ are rational, then $f(z_j)$ will always be 1 by the definition of $f(t)$, meaning $f(z_j)-1 = 0$. If this term is zero, then for any interval length, the following inequality will be true:
$$\left|\sum [f(z_j)-1] l(J_j)\right| \leq \varepsilon,$$

So for this case, 1 is the integral of $f(t)$.

Case 2: $z_k = c_k$ (Some tag of $D$ is rational):

If a tag of $D$ is rational, then the function evaluated at that point will be 0, which is a problem. Since we know $D$ is $\delta$-fine, the inequality
$$\left|\sum [f(z_j)-1] l(J_j)\right| \leq \left|\sum [f(z_j)-1] l(\delta(c_k))\right|$$
holds because the length of any interval $J_j$ is shorter than its covering by the definition of being $\delta$-fine. If we can construct a gauge $\delta$ out of the right side of the inequality, then we can show the criteria are met for an integral to exist.

To do this, let $\gamma_k = \varepsilon / [f(c_k)-c]2^{k+2}$ and set our covering gauges $\delta(c_k) = (c_k - \gamma_k, c_k + \gamma_k)$, which makes
$$\left|\sum [f(z_j)-c]l(J_j)\right| < \varepsilon /2^{k+1}.$$

From t
$$\left|\sum [f(z_j)-1] l(J_j)\right| \leq 2\sum \varepsilon / 2^{k+1} = \varepsilon$$

Because
$$2\sum 1 / 2^{k+1} = 1$$
as a geometric series. This indicates that for this case, 1 is the integral of $f(t)$.

Since cases 1 and 2 are exhaustive, this shows that the integral of $f(t)$ is 1 and all properties from the above section hold.

== McShane integral ==
Lebesgue integral on a line can also be presented in a similar fashion.

If we take the definition of the Henstock–Kurzweil integral from above, and we drop the condition

$$t_i \in [u_{i-1}, u_i],$$

then we get a definition of the McShane integral, which is equivalent to the Lebesgue integral. Note that the condition

$$\forall i \ \ [u_{i-1}, u_i] \subset [t_i-\delta(t_i), t_i + \delta (t_i)]$$

does still apply, and we technically also require $t_i \in [a,b]$ for $f(t_i)$ to be defined.

== See also ==
- Pfeffer integral
- Cauchy principal value
- Hadamard finite part integral
