= James Clarke (footballer, born 1923) =

English footballer

Personal information
- Date of birth: 7 December 1923
- Place of birth: West Bromwich, England
- Date of death: 12 December 2014 (aged 91)
- Place of death: Adelaide, Australia
- Position: Left back

Senior career*
Years	Team	Apps	(Gls)
- Darlaston Town
1947–1954	Nottingham Forest	18	(0)
- Boston United
- * Club domestic league appearances and goals

James Clarke (7 December 1923 – 12 December 2014) was an English professional footballer who played as a left back.

== Career ==
Born in West Bromwich, Clarke signed for Nottingham Forest from Darlaston Town in May 1947. He later played for Boston United.
