= Ron Lynch (cricketer) =

English cricketer

Personal information
- Full name: Ronald Victor Lynch
- Born: 22 May 1923; Stratford, Essex, England
- Died: 28 June 2012 (aged 89); Woodford Green, London, England
- Batting: Right-handed
- Bowling: Slow left-arm orthodox

Domestic team information
- Years: Team
- 1954: Essex

Career statistics
Competition	First-class
Matches	3
Runs scored	7
Batting average	7.00
100s/50s	–/–
Top score	6*
Balls bowled	258
Wickets	4
Bowling average	26.75
5 wickets in innings	–
10 wickets in match	–
Best bowling	4/64
Catches/stumpings	2/–
- Source: Cricinfo, 2 July 2012

Ronald Victor Lynch (22 May 1923 – 28 June 2012) was an English cricketer. Lynch was a right-handed batsman who bowled slow left-arm orthodox. He was born at Stratford, Essex.

Lynch made his first-class debut for Essex against Nottinghamshire at the Old County Ground, Brentwood, in the 1954 County Championship. He made two further first-class appearances for the county in that season, against Northamptonshire at the Town Ground, Rushden, and Lancashire at Aigburth, Liverpool. In his three matches, he took a total of 4 wickets at an average of 26.75, with best figures of 4/64. With the bat he scored 7 runs.

Besides playing cricket, Lynch had a distinguished role as an administrator of the sport in Essex, as one of the driving forces behind the creation of the Essex League in 1972, serving as its chairman from 1972 to 1993, and later as honorary vice president. He died in Woodford Green, London, on 28 June 2012, following a long illness. His funeral was held at the City of London Cemetery and Crematorium.
