= Jack Rawlings =

English footballer

Personal information
- Full name: John William Rawlings
- Date of birth: 18 June 1923
- Place of birth: England
- Date of death: 21 September 2016 (aged 93)
- Position: Inside forward

Senior career*
Years	Team	Apps	(Gls)
19??–1949	Enfield		
1949–1955	Hayes	172	(44)
1955–1958	Hendon	64	(27)
Total		236+	(71+)

International career
1948	Great Britain	1	(0)
- * Club domestic league appearances and goals

John William "Jack" Rawlings (18 June 1923 – 21 September 2016) was an English amateur footballer who played as an inside forward.

== Career ==
Rawlings played as an amateur for Enfield, Hayes and Hendon. He also represented touring team Middlesex Wanderers.

Rawlings also represented Great Britain at the 1948 Summer Olympics.
