= Valéria Dienes =

Hungarian writer and philosopher (1879–1978)

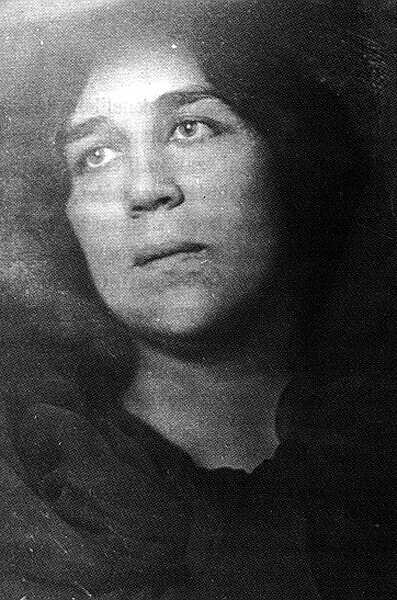
- Circa 1910
- Born: Valéria Geiger; 25 May 1879; Szekszárd, Austria-Hungary
- Died: 8 June 1978 (aged 99); Budapest, Hungarian People's Republic
- Occupations: Dancer; philosopher
- Years active: 1905–1948
- Known for: Pioneer of movement theories in Hungary

Valéria Dienes (25 May 1879 – 8 June 1978) was a Hungarian philosopher, dancer, dance instructor, choreographer and one of first Hungarian woman to graduate from university. She is widely considered to be one of the most important Hungarian theorists on movement. She was the recipient of Hungary's highest literary award, the Baumgarten Prize in 1934.

== Early life ==
Valéria Geiger was born on 25 May 1879 in Szekszárd, in the Austro-Hungarian Empire to Erzsébet (née Berczelits) and Gyula Geiger. Her father was a journalist and the Geiger family lived two houses away from her childhood friend Mihály Babits, who would later base some of the characters in his novel Halálfiai on the Geigers. She began her education at the Mária Mayer-Arlow School in Szekszárd and after completing 5 courses, began study at the State Civilian Girls' School in 1891. Graduating in 1893, Geiger began studying at the State Normal School in Győr, earning her teacher's degree in 1897. That same year, she moved to Budapest and enrolled in the three-year Civil-School Teacher Training Course held at #65 Andrássy Avenue, matriculating in 1901.

In 1901, Geiger entered Pázmány Péter Catholic University as a scholarship student of Wlassits College of the National Women's Training Institute and simultaneously began studying piano at the Budapest Academy of Music. Studying aesthetics, mathematics and philosophy, Geiger graduated with a dual-doctorate from the Philosophy Department in aesthetics and mathematics in June 1905. She became the first woman to obtain a PhD from the Philosophy Department with a thesis entitled Valóság-Elméletek (Reality-Theories). A few months later, she married a fellow mathematics student, Pál Dienes and the young couple spent the years 1906 and 1907 touring, traveling from Palermo to Tunis. Between 1908 and 1912, the couple lived in Paris, where Dienes attended classes given by Henri Bergson, attended performances by Isadora Duncan and courses on Greek classical eurythmy given by Raymond Duncan.

== Career ==
Returning to Budapest in 1912, Dienes created and taught a course based on Duncan's Greek movement ideas. Simultaneously, she began work translating the works of Bergson, Alfred Binet and others. She published an original work in the Galilei Booklets synthesizing the ideas of Ivan Pavlov and the Würzburg School to present a reform on the way thought processes were viewed by psychologists. She was the first person in Hungary to put forth the idea of functional psychology and advocate it for childhood development as a means of reforming educational activities. In 1915 she founded a school, which she called "Orkesztika" or "Orchestrics", incorporating her own ideas of motion. Evaluating the interrelationships of dynamics, kinetics, mimetics, and rhythmics, she created her own system to teach eurythmics and provide students with an understanding of the strength, space, expression and time needed to create dance. Her two sons, Gedeon and Zoltán were born in 1914 and 1916, respectively.

In 1919, Dienes designed a reform program for women's sports for the Hungarian Soviet Republic, but the following year was exiled from the country because of the White Terror violence. During the period, she gave performances in Belgrade, Vienna, Nice, and Paris, and taught at a Montessori school in Grinzing. Her husband fell in love with one of his students and moved to England, leaving Dienes the sole responsibility for their children. She went to France and joined the Duncan Art Colony in Paris, reuniting with the siblings Isadora and Raymond. Returning to Budapest in 1923, Dienes resumed teaching. She also returned to her Catholic roots. Her philosophical writings from this point, turned away from radical social philosophy and began to incorporate her Catholic beliefs into her works. Combining Bergson's theories that action, rather than passive thought, was fundamental to mental development, Dienes began to incorporate the ideas of Teilhard de Chardin and the influential priest Ottokár Prohászka into her philosophical writings. Prohászka advocated a philosophy which was both nationalistic and Christian, decidedly anti-Semtic and his influence caused Dienes to evaluate the role of religion and mysticism on the development of Hungarian thought. Her philosophy was grounded by a belief that human expression, was constantly evolving and was motivated by four pillars: a need to preserve the past, the absence of identity, constant change, and inevitability.

Dienes' choreographic works began by setting the verse of modern Hungarian poets, such as Endre Ady and Babits, to dance. By the 1920s, she had begun to publish her own works widely and perform large-scale movement dramas. Her first performance of her own work was Hajnalvárás (Waiting for Dawn, 1925), followed by Nyolc boldogság (The Eight Beatitudes, 1926). These drama performances used her own lyrics and were often set to the music of Lajos Bárdos and performed in an outdoor arena like the Budapest City Park. The scope was often massive, as in her performance of A gyermek útja (The Child's Path, 1935), which used nearly 1,000 performers. Some of Dienes' most important religious works included Hajnalvárás (Waiting for Dawn, 1925), Magyar Végzet (Hungarian Doom), Szent Imre Misztérium, (Saint Emery's Mystery, 1930–1931), A rózsák szentje (The Saint of Roses, 1932), Magvető (Sower, 1933), Tíz szűz (Ten Virgins, 1934), and Az anya (The Mother, 1937). In addition to religious works, Dienes created choreographies for fairy tales such as Fehér királylány (The White Princess, 1929), Csipkerózsa (Sleeping Beauty, 1931), Hamupipőke (Cinderella, 1934), and Hófehérke (Snow White, 1940). Fehér királylány was made into a motion picture in 1930. Patrona Hungariae (Patron of Hungary, 1938) was a historic drama retelling the Christianization of Hungary by King Stephen I and in 1940, she choreographed Az élet kenyere (The Bread of Life) to music by Bárdos.

By 1928 Dienes had founded, serving as co-president, the Movement Culture Association and the following year began offering a four-year teacher's courses to train professionals in the study of motion. In 1934, she was awarded the Baumgarten Prize, which at the time was the highest literary recognition in the country, for her contributions to Hungarian philosophy. She continued performing through the 1940s and her school remained open until 1944. After the rise of communism, Dienes was forgotten for many years, though she continued to work and develop her philosophical ideas. She worked on translations of John Locke's An Essay Concerning Human Understanding and Teilhard de Chardin's The Phenomenon of Man in the 1960s for the Hungarian Academy of Sciences. In 1975, a television program by Iván Vitányi highlighted her multi-faceted personality.

== Death and legacy ==
Dienes died on 8 June 1978 in Budapest. In 1991, a school in her hometown was renamed to bear her name. That same year, the Orchestrics Foundation was created in Hungary to re-introduce the Duncan-Dienes method of eurythmics. In 1996, her collected works on her theories of movement, Orkesztika—Mozdulatrendszer (Orchestics—System of Movement) was first published. The book analyzes how movement is limited by both the anatomy and environment, which is further impacted by the amount of energy and time movement will take and the meaning one wants to convey. The Hungarian Art of Movement Company has held honorary performances to recognize the pioneering work of Dienes on her 120th and 125th birthday.
