= Denis Haynes =

English cricketer (1923–2012)

Personal information
- Full name: Denis Marshall Haynes
- Born: 29 December 1923; Stoke-on-Trent, Staffordshire, England
- Died: 26 November 2012 (aged 88); Thetford, Norwich, England
- Batting: Right-handed
- Bowling: Right-arm medium

Domestic team information
- Years: Team
- 1956: Marylebone Cricket Club
- 1946–1957: Staffordshire

Career statistics
Competition	First-class
Matches	1
Runs scored	8
Batting average	8.00
100s/50s	–/–
Top score	4
Balls bowled	–
Wickets	–
Bowling average	–
5 wickets in innings	–
10 wickets in match	–
Best bowling	–
Catches/stumpings	1/–
- Source: Cricinfo, 3 June 2011

Denis Marshall Haynes (29 December 1923 – 26 November 2012) was an English cricketer. Haynes was a right-handed batsman who bowled right-arm medium pace. He was born at Stoke-on-Trent, Staffordshire and was educated at Denstone College, and later St Catharine's College, Cambridge.

Haynes made his debut for Staffordshire following the Second World War in the 1946 Minor Counties Championship against Cheshire. Haynes played Minor counties cricket for Staffordshire from 1946 to 1957, making 90 appearances.

He made his only first-class appearance for the Marylebone Cricket Club against Oxford University in 1956. In the MCC first-innings, he was run out for 8, while in their second-innings he was dismissed for a duck by Jimmy Allan.

He died at Thetford, Norfolk, on 26 November 2012.
