= Jaroslav Kurzweil =

Czech mathematician (1926–2022)

Jaroslav Kurzweil (Czech pronunciation: [ˈjaroslaf ˈkurtsvajl], 7 May 1926, Prague – 17 March 2022) was a Czech mathematician.

== Biography ==
Born in Prague, Czechoslovakia, Kurzweil was a specialist in ordinary differential equations and defined the Henstock–Kurzweil integral in terms of Riemann sums, first published in 1957 in the Czechoslovak Mathematical Journal. He has been awarded the highest possible scientific prize of Czechia, the "Czech Brain" of the year 2006, as an acknowledgement of his life achievements.

With limited opportunities of contact between mathematicians within the Iron Curtain and those from the West, Kurzweil and Ivo Babuška founded a series of international scientific conferences named EQUADIFF, being held every four years since 1962 alternately in Prague, Bratislava, and Brno. He was chief editor of Mathematica Bohemica (then called Časopis pro pěstování matematiky) from 1956 to 1970 and was in its editorial board until 2007. In 2007, Kurzweil delivered a New Year's toast on Czech Television.

== See also ==
- Henstock–Kurzweil integral
