= Jack Hearn =

English judo instructor (1923–2026)

John Hearn BEM (19 September 1923 – 10 October 2026), also known as Judo Jack, was an English judo instructor. He began practising judo in 1951 and set up a club three years later. In 2020, he was awarded his 10th dan rank. At age 100, he was confirmed by Guinness World Records as the oldest active judo instructor.

== Early life and military service ==
John Hearn was born on 19 September 1923 in North Shields, where he was also raised. During the Second World War he enlisted in the Royal Northumberland Fusiliers when he was 18, in 1942. He fought in Algiers, where due to an eye condition that would affect his use of a rifle, he operated a Bren light machine gun at the back of a convoy. He was a driver with the Royal Army Service Corps at the Battle of Monte Cassino. In May 2024, he was one of few surviving veterans to attend the 80th anniversary of the end of the battle.

== Judo ==
Hearn was a racing cyclist, and cycled as far away as Lincoln and northern Scotland. He gave up cycling after appendix surgery, and took up judo in North Shields in 1951. He and his brother Bob set up a judo club in 1954, using sawdust and army surplus material to make mats. He was attracted to judo as an individual sport, and how techniques such as a breakfall would be learned through experience. After teaching a Japanese student from Newcastle University, he was given the Japanese title Hoko Jun, meaning "Defender of the North", and used the name in competitions and classes.

After retiring from his job as a docker, Hearn continued as a judo instructor. In 2016, he told HuffPost that pensioners should take up new physical activities, and that he had recently begun dancing. Aged 94 in 2018, he said on BBC Three's Amazing Humans that he would only give up judo when the last nail was hammered into his coffin. The following year, he told Metro that he would climb and descend his home's staircase to keep fit. He did a promotional campaign for Seven Seas nutritional supplements, in which the 95-year-old fought former cricketers Graeme Swann and Phil Tufnell at judo.

Hearn was awarded his 10th dan ranking in 2020, for the 10th anniversary of his 9th dan. He applied to Guinness World Records as the oldest judo instructor in the same year, and his claim was verified and his certificate arrived in 2023. Aged 100, he continued as a technical advisor, judge and examiner, travelling as far as Essex. He said that due to "minor problems with [his] legs", he left physical demonstration to younger instructors.

== Personal life and death ==
As of December 2023, Hearn lived in Cramlington and had five children, 14 grandchildren and six great-grandchildren. For his 100th birthday, Northumberland County Council held an event in his honour at County Hall in Morpeth.

Hearn was awarded the British Empire Medal in the 2026 New Year Honours. Aged 102, he was the oldest person to receive an award in the listing. In March 2026, Cramlington Town Council awarded him the Freedom of Cramlington.

Hearn died on 10 October 2026, aged 103. Emma Foody, MP for Cramlington and Killingworth, said "He's done so much, whether that was as a judo instructor, his kind of commitment to young people, but also just to the community more generally".
