= Arthur Oglesby =

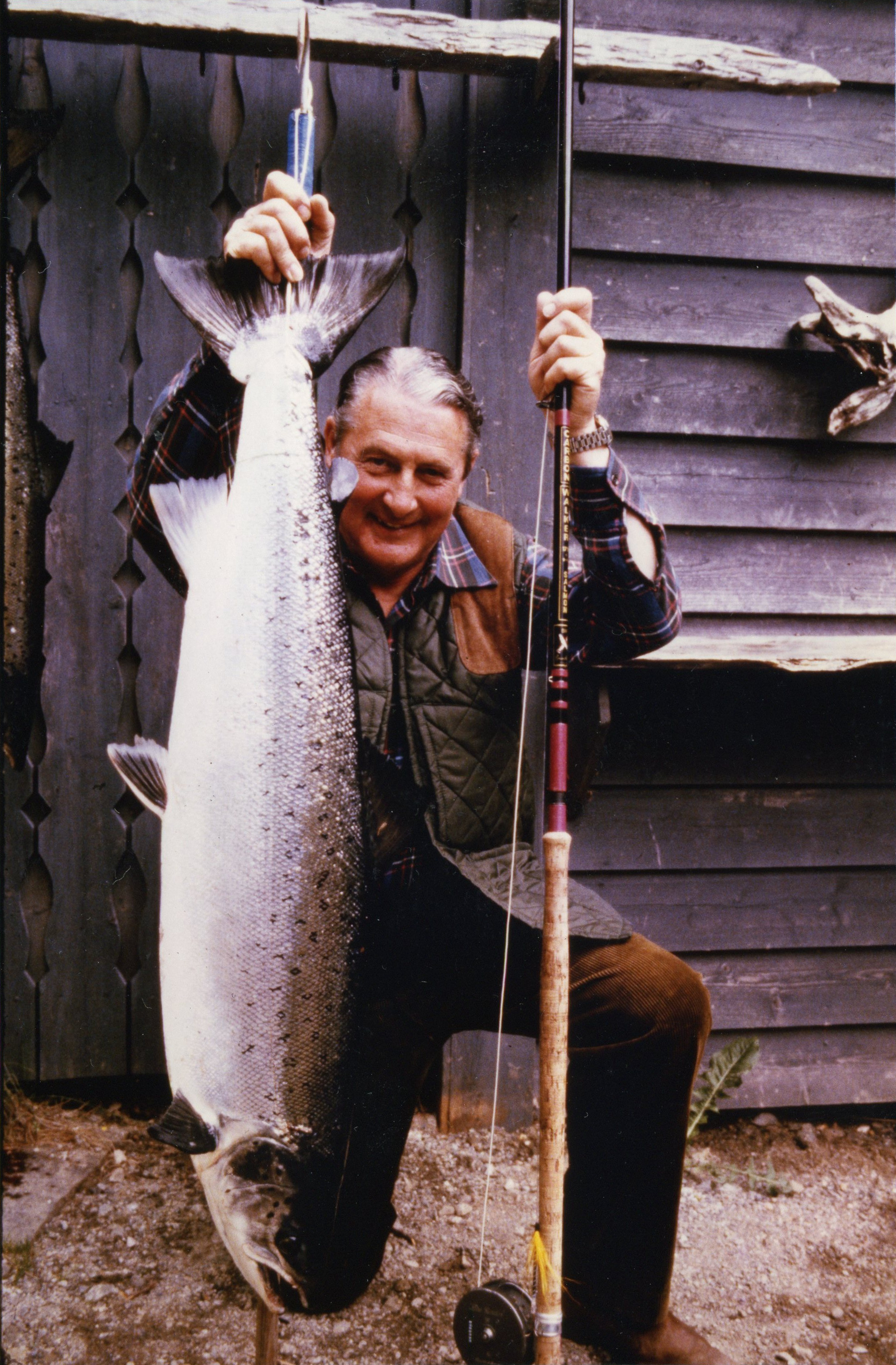
- Born: 21 December 1923; Scarborough, Yorkshire, England
- Died: 2 December 2000 (aged 76); Harrogate, Yorkshire
- Known for: Writer, film-maker, broadcaster and fisherman

Arthur Victor Oglesby (21 December 1923 – 2 December 2000) was a British writer, photographer, filmmaker, broadcaster and fisherman. He was best known for his books on salmon fishing.

== Early years ==
Arthur Oglesby was born in Scarborough in December 1923, before the family moved to York when he was 2 years old. In his autobiography Reeling In, he described his Yorkshire childhood as "semi-Victorian". As a boy he enjoyed a rural life, where he was first introduced to fishing. Leaving school at 16 years, he became an apprentice chemist for the family manufacturing pharmaceuticals business, Harvey Scruton, York (his grandfather, a chemist, had invented Nurse Harvey's Gripe Water, as a remedy for colic in infants).

At the age of 18 years, Oglesby joined the Black Watch regiment, and saw action in Northern France during the Second World War. He was wounded in Normandy in the thigh and chest, just a few weeks after surviving the D-Day landings in June 1944. He was latterly stationed in Gibraltar from 1945–7 and left the Army as a Captain, returning to Yorkshire to help run the family business.

== Career ==
When he was not working in his family business, Oglesby spent as much time as he could on his hobbies of fishing, shooting and photography. In 1950 he began to combine these hobbies by taking photos of angling subjects. His first commission was for ICI where he sold some transparencies for their calendar. He then began to submit articles for magazines such as The Field, Creel and Angling, Shooting Times, Amateur Photographer and the American Field & Stream, becoming their European editor.

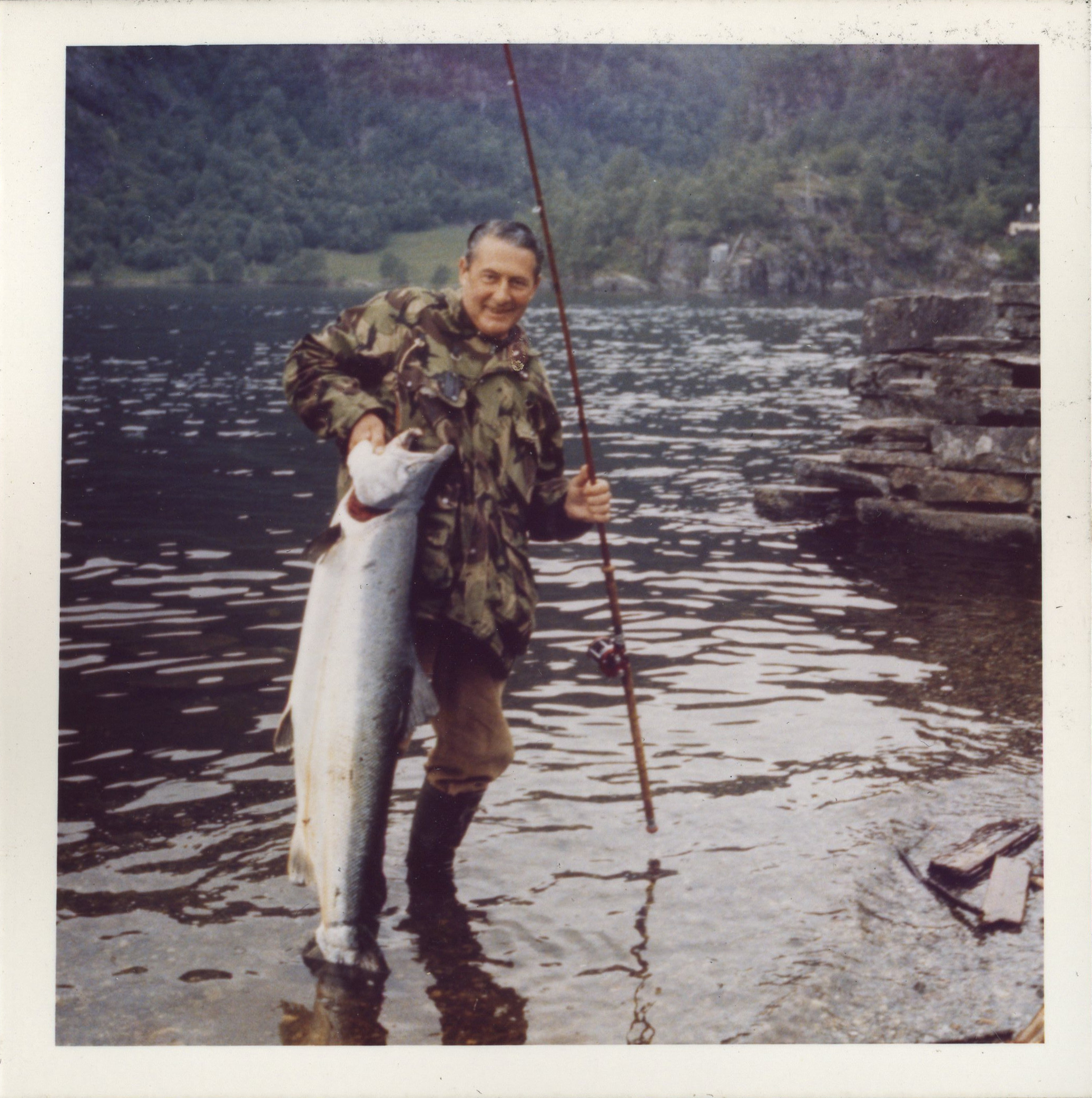
Arthur Oglesby catching an Atlantic salmon on the Vosso in Norway

Oglesby became the editor of Anglers Annual for three years during the mid-Sixties, for two decades was a weekly contributor to Shooting Times, and wrote regularly for Trout & Salmon. His photographic archive held more than 30,000 images.

Oglesby first visited the River Spey in 1957 with his mentor Eric Horsfall Turner and met up with Captain T L 'Tommy' Edwards, who was running some of the first-ever fishing courses and took him on as an assistant instructor. On Edwards' death in 1968, he took over the courses on Speyside teaching guests to perfect their Salmon fishing and Spey casting for over 30 years.

From 1968 onward, Oglesby took a back seat in the running of the family business, moved to Harrogate and concentrated on making a career from angling. In 1969 he helped to found the Association of Professional Game Angling Instructors and was its chairman for many years

Oglesby was a prolific writer, with a total of nine books to his own pen or co-authored. His first was in 1971 titled Salmon and his most famous book was Fly Fishing for Salmon & Sea Trout, written in 1986.

Oglesby was most renowned for catching two huge Atlantic salmon on the Bolstrad beat of the Vosso river in Norway including one in 1973, his largest ever fish weighing 49 1/2lb. He caught some of the largest catches of his generation, and over the course of his career, he landed over 2,500 Atlantic salmon.

Oglesby ran the casting demonstrations at the annual CLA Game Fair and in 1999 he was awarded their Lifetime Achievement Award.

For many years, Oglesby led fishing parties to Iceland, Alaska, Norway and Russia, usually in the company of his second wife Grace, herself an accomplished angler. He continued to run the fishing school at Grantown-on-Spey in Scotland during the spring weeks and late summer each year, teaching hundreds of people to perfect the art of salmon fishing.

In December 2000, at the age of 76, Oglesby died suddenly, from an undiagnosed infection, after heart surgery a few months earlier.

== Family ==
Arthur Oglesby was married twice, firstly to Mary in 1947 (divorced 1968) and secondly to Grace in 1969. He was survived by his second wife Grace, two boys from his first marriage Peter & John, and two boys from his second marriage Paul & Mark.

== Legacy ==
In 2001, the CLA Game Fair commissioned Ian Greensitt to produce a bronze salmon trophy for the Arthur Oglesby Award. This was awarded annually to someone who has made a lifetime contribution to the sport of fishing and who has made a particular impact in the last year. Previous winners have included Sandy Leventon, Charles Jardine, Hugh Miles, Eoin Fairgrieve, Martin Salter MP and Naidre Werner.

The Oglesby Suite at Goldsborough Hall, owned by his youngest son Mark and wife Clare, has been named in Oglesby's honour. It was opened in 2012 by friend and fellow fishing writer David Profumo. Wooden fish replicas trophies of Oglesby's huge catches on the Norwegian Vosso (46 1/2lb and 49 1/2lb) hang in the Oglesby Suite and in the reception of Goldsborough Hall.

== Films ==
Game Fishing and Fly Casting by Arthur Oglesby and Hugh Falkus, 1983

Flyfishing Volume I (An introduction to fly fishing), Volume II (Trout, Grayling and Salmon) and Volume III (Stillwater Flyfishing) by Arthur Oglesby

== Books ==
- Salmon by Arthur Oglesby, published by Macdonald, 1971, ISBN 0356080005 ISBN 9780356080000
- Fly Fishing for Salmon & Sea Trout by Arthur Oglesby, published by The Crowood Press Ltd, 1986, ISBN 1861260725 ISBN 9781861260727
- The Complete Book of Fishing by Arthur Oglesby, John Wilson, Trevor Housby, Mike Millman, Peter Gathercole, published by Octopus Books Ltd, 1987, ISBN 0706430271 ISBN 9780706430271
- A Guide to Salmon Flies by John Buckland and Arthur Oglesby published by The Crowood Press, 1990, ISBN 9781852232467
- Reeling In by Arthur Oglesby, published by The Crowood Press, 1988, ISBN 1852231130
- The Complete book of Flyfishing by Arthur Oglesby, Bengt Öste, Lefty Kreh and Steen Ulnitz, published by Stoeger Publishing Company, 1997, ISBN 0883172089, 9780883172087
