= Otakar Borůvka =

Czech academic and mathematician

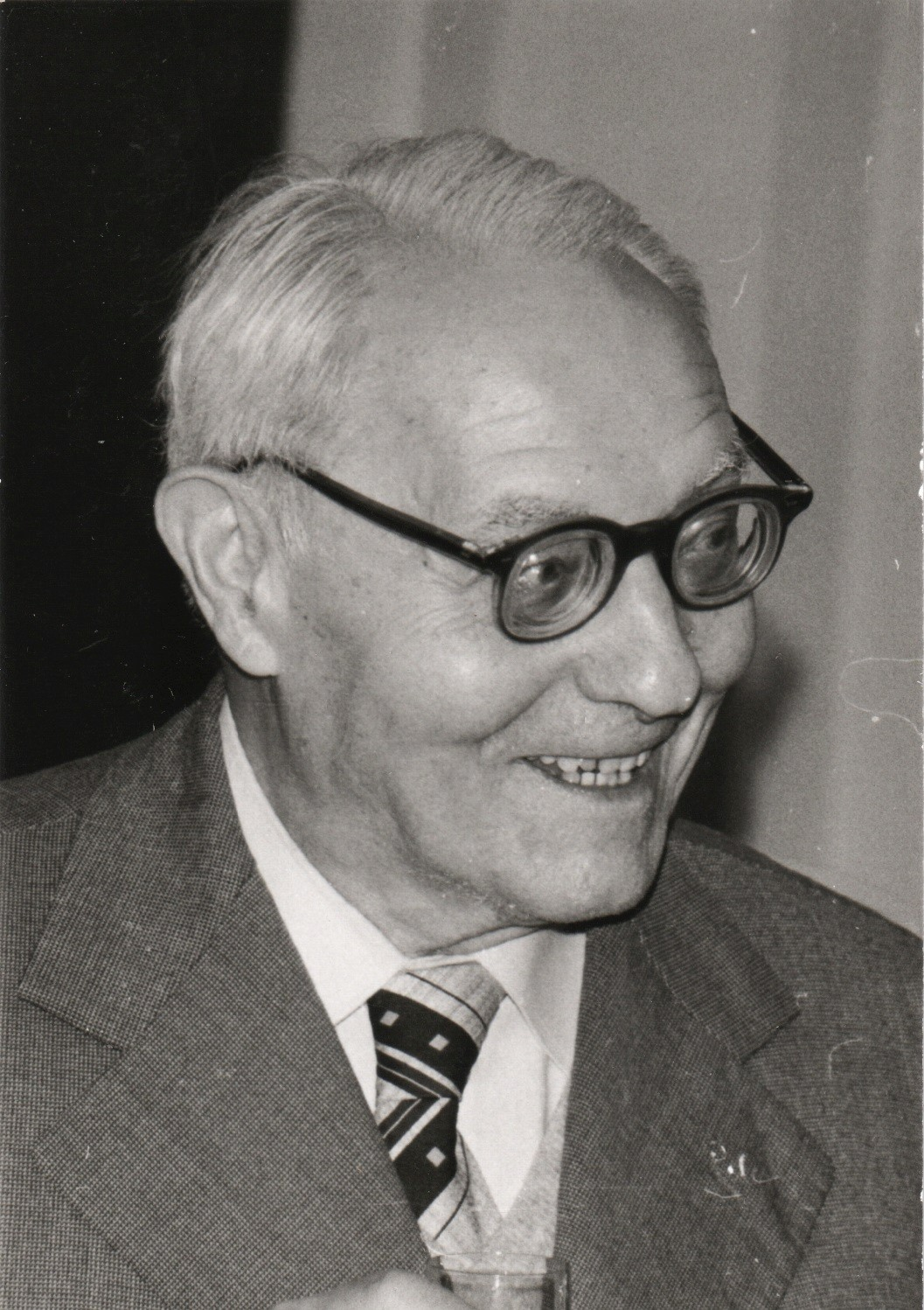
- Born: 10 May 1899; Uherský Ostroh, Austria-Hungary
- Died: 22 July 1995 (aged 96); Brno, Czech Republic
- Occupation: Mathematician
- Known for: Minimum spanning tree problem; Archivum Mathematicum

Otakar Borůvka (10 May 1899 – 22 July 1995) was a Czech mathematician. He is best known for his work in graph theory.

== Education and career ==
Borůvka was born in Uherský Ostroh, a town in Moravia, Austria-Hungary (today in the Czech Republic), the son of a school headmaster. He attended the grammar school in Uherské Hradiště beginning in 1910. In 1916, influenced by the ongoing World War I, he moved to the military school (Realschule) in Hranice, and later he enrolled into the Imperial and Royal Technical Military Academy in Mödling near Vienna.

When the war ended, Borůvka returned to Uherské Hradiště, finished his studies in 1918 at the Gymnasium there, and became a student at the Imperial Czech Technical University of Franz Joseph, in Brno, initially studying civil engineering. In 1920, Masaryk University opened in Brno, and Borůvka also began taking courses there. He became an assistant to Mathias Lerch at Masaryk in 1921, but Lerch died in 1922; his position at Masaryk was taken by Eduard Čech, whom Borůvka also assisted, earning his doctorate in 1923.

At Čech's suggestion, Borůvka visited Élie Cartan in Paris from 1926 to 1927. He earned his habilitation from Masaryk University in 1927, and (turning down an offer from the University of Zagreb) he became a docent there in 1928. He continued to travel abroad through the late 1920s and early 1930s, to Cartan in Paris again as well as to Wilhelm Blaschke in Hamburg. He was promoted to assistant professor at Masaryk in 1934, given a chair in 1940, and made an ordinary professor in 1946.

In 1965, he founded the new journal Archivum Mathematicum, and in 1969, he became a founding member of the Institute of Mathematics of the Czechoslovak Academy of Sciences, splitting his time between the Institute and his professorship at Masaryk.

== Contributions ==
The problem of designing efficient electric distribution networks had been suggested to Borůvka by his friend Jindřich Saxel, an employee of the West Moravian Power Company, during World War I. In his 1926 paper O jistém problému minimálním (English On a certain minimal problem), Borůvka solved this problem by modeling it mathematically as a minimum spanning tree problem, and described the first known algorithm for finding the minimum spanning tree of a metric space (the set of cities to be connected by the network, together with their distances). Now called Borůvka's algorithm, his method works by repeatedly adding a connections between each subtree of the minimum spanning tree found so far and its nearest neighboring subtree. The same algorithm has been rediscovered repeatedly. It is more suitable for distributed and parallel computation than many other minimum spanning tree algorithms, can achieve linear time complexity on planar graphs and more generally in minor-closed graph families, and plays a central role in the randomized linear time algorithm of Karger, Klein & Tarjan (1995).

From 1924 to 1935, Borůvka's primary interest was in differential geometry. His work in this area concerned analytic correspondences between projective planes, normal curvature of high-dimensional surfaces, and Frenet formula for curves in high-dimensional spaces.

Beginning in the 1930s, Borůvka's interests shifted to abstract algebra, and in particular the theory of groups. He was also one of the first to study a generalization of groups, called by him "groupoids" but now more commonly referred to as magmas. A textbook by him on groups and groupoids, originally published in Czech in 1944, went through several expansions, and translations, including an English edition in 1976.

Following the war, Borůvka shifted gears again, from algebra to the theory of differential equations. He published several research papers on this subject, as well as a monograph on second-order differential equations which he published in 1971.

== Awards and honors ==
Borůvka became a corresponding member of the Czechoslovak Academy of Sciences at its creation in 1953, and an ordinary member in 1965. In 1969, Comenius University in Bratislava gave him an honorary doctorate, and in 1994 he received a second honorary doctorate from Masaryk University in Brno.

He has also been given medals by the Free University of Brussels, the University of Liège, Jagiellonian University, Comenius University, Palacký University of Olomouc, Jan Evangelista Purkyně University in Ústí nad Labem, the German Academy of Sciences at Berlin, the Russian Academy of Sciences#Academy of Sciences of the USSR, and the Czechoslovak Academy of Sciences.
