= Valerie King =

American and Canadian computer scientist

Valerie King is an American and Canadian computer scientist who works as a professor at the University of Victoria. Her research concerns the design and analysis of algorithms; her work has included results on maximum flow and dynamic graph algorithms, and played a role in the expected linear time MST algorithm of Karger et al.

She became a Fellow of the Association for Computing Machinery in 2014.

== Education ==
King graduated from Princeton University in 1977. She earned a Juris Doctor degree from the University of California, Berkeley School of Law in 1983, and became a member of the State Bar of California, but returned to Berkeley and earned a Ph.D. in computer science in 1988 under the supervision of Richard Karp with a dissertation concerning the Aanderaa–Karp–Rosenberg conjecture.
