= Small-world routing =

Routing methods for networks with short node paths

In network theory, small-world routing refers to routing methods for small-world networks. Networks of this type are peculiar in that relatively short paths exist between any two nodes. Determining these paths, however, can be a difficult problem from the perspective of an individual routing node in the network if no further information is known about the network as a whole.

== Greedy routing ==
Nearly every solution to the problem of routing in small world involves the application of greedy routing. This sort of routing depends on a relative reference point by which any node in the path can choose the next node it believes is closest to the destination. That is, there must be something to be greedy about. For example, this could be geographic location, IP address, etc. In the case of Milgram's original small-world experiment, participants knew the location and occupation of the final recipient and could therefore forward messages based on those parameters.

== Constructing a reference base ==
Greedy routing will not readily work when there is no obvious reference base. This can occur, for example, in overlay networks where information about the destination's location in the underlying network is not available. Friend-to-friend networks are a particular example of this problem. In such networks, trust is ensured by the fact that you only know underlying information about nodes with whom you are already a neighbor.

One solution in this case, is to impose some sort of artificial addressing on the nodes in such a way that this addressing can be effectively used by greedy routing methods. A 2005 paper by a developer of the Freenet Project discusses how this can be accomplished in friend to friend networks. Given the assumption that these networks exhibit small world properties, often as the result of real-world or acquaintance relationships, it should be possible to recover an embedded Kleinberg small-world graph. This is accomplished by selecting random pairs of nodes and potentially swapping them based on an objective function that minimizes the product of all the distances between any given node and its neighbors.

An important problem involved with this solution is the possibility of local minima. This can occur if nodes are in a situation that is optimal only considering a local neighborhood, while ignoring the possibility of a higher optimality resulting from swaps with distant nodes. In the above paper, the authors proposed a simulated annealing method where less-than-optimal swaps were made with a small probability. This probability was proportional to the value of making the switches. Another possible metaheuristic optimization method is a tabu search, which adds a memory to the swap decision. In its most simplistic form, a limited history of past swaps is remembered so that they will be excluded from the list of possible swapping nodes.

This method for constructing a reference base can also be adapted to distributed settings, where decisions can only be made at the level of individual nodes who have no knowledge of the overall network. It turns out that the only modification necessary is in the method for selecting pairs of random nodes. In a distributed setting, this is done by having each node periodically send out a random walker terminating at a node to be considered for swapping.

== The Kleinberg model ==
The Kleinberg model of a network is effective at demonstrating the effectiveness of greedy small world routing. The model uses an n x n grid of nodes to represent a network, where each node is connected with an undirected edge to its neighbors. To give it the "small world" effect, a number of long range edges are added to the network that tend to favor nodes closer in distance rather than farther. When adding edges, the probability of connecting some random vertex $v$ to another random vertex w is proportional to $1/d(v,w)^q$, where $q$ is the clustering exponent.

=== Greedy routing in the Kleinberg model ===
It is easy to see that a greedy algorithm, without using the long range edges, can navigate from random vertices $v \rightarrow w$ on the grid in $O(n)$ time. By following the guaranteed connections to our neighbors, we can move one unit at a time in the direction of our destination. This is also the case when the clustering component $q$ is large and the "long range" edges end up staying very close; we simply do not take advantage of the weaker ties in this model. When $q = 0$, the long range edges are uniformly connected at random which means the long range edges are "too random" to be used efficiently for decentralized search. Kleinberg has shown that the optimal clustering coefficient for this model is $q=2$, or an inverse square distribution.

To reason why this is the case, if a circle of radius r is drawn around the initial node it will have nodal density $n/(\pi r^2)$ where n is the number of nodes in the circular area. As this circle gets expanded further out, the number of nodes in the given area increases proportional to $r^2$ as the probability of having a random link with any node remains proportional $1/r^2$, meaning the probability of the original node having a weak tie with any node a given distance away is effectively independent of distance. Therefore, it is concluded that with $q=2$, long-range edges are evenly distributed over all distances, which is effective for letting us funnel to our final destination.

Some structured Peer-to-peer systems based on DHTs often are implementing variants of Kleinberg's Small-World topology to enable efficient routing within Peer-to-peer network with limited node degrees.

== See also ==
- Social network – Social structure made up of a set of social actors
- Small-world network – Graph where most nodes are reachable in a small number of steps
- Watts-Strogatz model – Method of generating random small-world graphs
