= Hanan grid =

Type of geometric grid

Hanan grid generated for a 5-terminal case

In geometry, the Hanan grid H(S) of a finite set S of points in the plane is obtained by constructing vertical and horizontal lines through each point in S.

The main motivation for studying the Hanan grid stems from the fact that it is known to contain a minimum length rectilinear Steiner tree for S. It is named after Maurice Hanan, who was first to investigate the rectilinear Steiner minimum tree and introduced this graph.
