= Activity selection problem =

Combinatorial optimization problem

The activity selection problem is a combinatorial optimization problem concerning the selection of non-conflicting activities to perform within a given time frame, given a set of activities each marked by a start time (s_{i}) and finish time (f_{i}). The problem is to select the maximum number of activities that can be performed by a single person or machine, assuming that a person can only work on a single activity at a time. The activity selection problem is also known as the Interval scheduling maximization problem (ISMP), which is a special type of the more general Interval Scheduling problem.

A classic application of this problem is in scheduling a room for multiple competing events, each having its own time requirements (start and end time), and many more arise within the framework of operations research.

== Formal definition ==
Assume there exist n activities with each of them being represented by a start time s_{i} and finish time f_{i}. Two activities i and j are said to be non-conflicting if s_{i} ≥ f_{j} or s_{j} ≥ f_{i}. The activity selection problem consists in finding the maximal solution set (S) of non-conflicting activities, or more precisely there must exist no solution set S' such that |S'| > |S| in the case that multiple maximal solutions have equal sizes.

== Optimal solution ==
The activity selection problem is notable in that using a greedy algorithm to find a solution will always result in an optimal solution. A pseudocode sketch of the iterative version of the algorithm and a proof of the optimality of its result are included below.

=== Algorithm ===
Greedy-Iterative-Activity-Selector(A, s, f): 

    Sort A by finish times stored in f
    S = {A[1]} 
    k = 1
    
    n = A.length
    
    for i = 2 to n:
        if s[i] ≥ f[k]: 
            S = S U {A[i]}
            k = i
    
    return S

==== Explanation ====
Line 1: This algorithm is called Greedy-Iterative-Activity-Selector, because it is first of all a greedy algorithm, and then it is iterative. There's also a recursive version of this greedy algorithm.

- $A$ is an array containing the activities.
- $s$ is an array containing the start times of the activities in $A$.
- $f$ is an array containing the finish times of the activities in $A$.

Note that these arrays are indexed starting from 1 up to the length of the corresponding array.

Line 3: Sorts in increasing order of finish times the array of activities $A$ by using the finish times stored in the array $f$. This operation can be done in $O(n \cdot \log n)$ time, using for example merge sort, heap sort, or quick sort algorithms.

Line 4: Creates a set $S$ to store the selected activities, and initialises it with the activity $A[1]$ that has the earliest finish time.

Line 5: Creates a variable $k$ that keeps track of the index of the last selected activity.

Line 9: Starts iterating from the second element of that array $A$ up to its last element.

Lines 10,11: If the start time $s[i]$ of the $ith$ activity ($A[i]$) is greater or equal to the finish time $f[k]$ of the last selected activity ($A[k]$), then $A[i]$ is compatible to the selected activities in the set $S$, and thus it can be added to $S$.

Line 12: The index of the last selected activity is updated to the just added activity $A[i]$.

=== Proof of optimality ===
Let $S = \{1, 2, \ldots , n\}$ be the set of activities ordered by finish time. Assume that $A\subseteq S$ is an optimal solution, also ordered by finish time; and that the index of the first activity in A is $k\neq 1$, i.e., this optimal solution does not start with the greedy choice. We will show that $B = (A \setminus \{k\}) \cup \{1\}$, which begins with the greedy choice (activity 1), is another optimal solution. Since $f_1 \leq f_k$, and the activities in A are disjoint by definition, the activities in B are also disjoint. Since B has the same number of activities as A, that is, $|A| = |B|$, B is also optimal.

Once the greedy choice is made, the problem reduces to finding an optimal solution for the subproblem. If A is an optimal solution to the original problem S containing the greedy choice, then $A^\prime = A \setminus \{1\}$ is an optimal solution to the activity-selection problem $S' = \{i \in S: s_i \geq f_1\}$.

Why? If this were not the case, pick a solution B′ to S′ with more activities than A′ containing the greedy choice for S′. Then, adding 1 to B′ would yield a feasible solution B to S with more activities than A, contradicting the optimality.

=== Weighted activity selection problem ===
The generalized version of the activity selection problem involves selecting an optimal set of non-overlapping activities such that the total weight is maximized. Unlike the unweighted version, there is no greedy solution to the weighted activity selection problem. However, a dynamic programming solution can readily be formed using the following approach:

Consider an optimal solution containing activity k. We now have non-overlapping activities on the left and right of k. We can recursively find solutions for these two sets because of optimal sub-structure. As we don't know k, we can try each of the activities. This approach leads to an $O(n^3)$ solution. This can be optimized further considering that for each set of activities in $(i, j)$, we can find the optimal solution if we had known the solution for $(i, t)$, where t is the last non-overlapping interval with j in $(i, j)$. This yields an $O(n^2)$ solution. This can be further optimized considering the fact that we do not need to consider all ranges $(i, j)$ but instead just $(1, j)$. The following algorithm thus yields an $O(n \log n)$ solution:

Weighted-Activity-Selection(S):  // S = list of activities

    sort S by finish time
    opt[0] = 0  // opt[j] represents optimal solution (sum of weights of selected activities) for S[1,2..,j]
   
    for i = 1 to n:
        t = binary search to find activity with finish time <= start time for i
            // if there are more than one such activities, choose the one with last finish time
        opt[i] = MAX(opt[i-1], opt[t] + w(i))
        
    return opt[n]
