= Extremal Ensemble Learning =

Machine learning paradigm

Extremal Ensemble Learning (EEL) is a machine learning algorithmic paradigm for graph partitioning. EEL creates an ensemble of partitions and then uses information contained in the ensemble to find new and improved partitions. The ensemble evolves and learns how to form improved partitions through extremal updating procedure. The final solution is found by achieving consensus among its member partitions about what the optimal partition is.

== Reduced-Network Extremal Ensemble Learning (RenEEL) ==
A particular implementation of the EEL paradigm is the Reduced-Network Extremal Ensemble Learning (RenEEL) scheme for partitioning a graph. RenEEL uses consensus across many partitions in an ensemble to create a reduced network that can be efficiently analyzed to find more accurate partitions. These better quality partitions are subsequently used to update the ensemble. An algorithm that utilizes the RenEEL scheme is currently the best algorithm for finding the graph partition with maximum modularity, which is an NP-hard problem.
