= Michelle Girvan =

American physicist

Michelle Girvan (born 1977) is an American physicist and network scientist whose research combines methods from dynamical systems, graph theory, and statistical mechanics and applies them to problems including epidemiology, gene regulation, and the study of Information cascades. She is one of the namesakes of the Girvan–Newman algorithm, used to detect community structure in complex systems.

Girvan is a professor of physics at the University of Maryland, College Park.

== Education and career ==
Girvan graduated from the Massachusetts Institute of Technology in 1999, with a double major in mathematics and physics and a minor in political science. She completed a Ph.D. in physics at Cornell University in 2004. Her dissertation, The Structure and Dynamics of Complex Networks, was supervised by Steven Strogatz.

After postdoctoral research at the Santa Fe Institute, she joined the University of Maryland faculty in 2007. In 2022 she was named a Distinguished Scholar-Teacher by the University of Maryland, College Park, being one of only 24 faculty members to earn this title as of 2026.

== Recognition ==
In 2017 Girvan was named a Fellow of the American Physical Society (APS), after a nomination from the APS Topical Group on Statistical & Nonlinear Physics, "for seminal contributions to the nonlinear and statistical physics of complex networks, including the characterization of network structures and dynamics, and interdisciplinary applications".

== Personal life and family ==
Girvan is the daughter of US Air Force Captain Robert E. Girvan (1942–2009) and Shigeko Afuso Girvan (died 2008). In 2013 she married law professor Jonathan Siegel of George Washington University.
