= Girvan–Newman algorithm =

Community detection algorithm

The Girvan–Newman algorithm (named after Michelle Girvan and Mark Newman) is a hierarchical method used to detect communities in complex systems.

== Edge betweenness and community structure ==
The Girvan–Newman algorithm detects communities by progressively removing edges from the original network. The connected components of the remaining network are the communities. Instead of trying to construct a measure that tells us which edges are the most central to communities, the Girvan–Newman algorithm focuses on edges that are most likely "between" communities.

Vertex betweenness is an indicator of highly central nodes in networks. For any node $i$, vertex betweenness is defined as the fraction of shortest paths between pairs of nodes that run through it. It is relevant to models where the network modulates transfer of goods between known start and end points, under the assumption that such transfer seeks the shortest available route.

The Girvan–Newman algorithm extends this definition to the case of edges, defining the "edge betweenness" of an edge as the number of shortest paths between pairs of nodes that run along it. If there is more than one shortest path between a pair of nodes, each path is assigned equal weight such that the total weight of all of the paths is equal to unity. If a network contains communities or groups that are only loosely connected by a few inter-group edges, then all shortest paths between different communities must go along one of these few edges. Thus, the edges connecting communities will have high edge betweenness (at least one of them). By removing these edges, the groups are separated from one another and so the underlying community structure of the network is revealed.

The algorithm's steps for community detection are summarized below

1. The betweenness of all existing edges in the network is calculated first.
2. The edge(s) with the highest betweenness are removed.
3. The betweenness of all edges affected by the removal is recalculated.
4. Steps 2 and 3 are repeated until no edges remain.

The fact that the only betweennesses being recalculated are only the ones which are affected by the removal, may lessen the running time of the process' simulation in computers. However, the betweenness centrality must be recalculated with each step, or severe errors occur. The reason is that the network adapts itself to the new conditions set after the edge removal. For instance, if two communities are connected by more than one edge, then there is no guarantee that all of these edges will have high betweenness. According to the method, we know that at least one of them will have, but nothing more than that is known. By recalculating betweennesses after the removal of each edge, it is ensured that at least one of the remaining edges between two communities will always have a high value.

The end result of the Girvan–Newman algorithm is a dendrogram. As the Girvan–Newman algorithm runs, the dendrogram is produced from the top down (i.e. the network splits up into different communities with the successive removal of links). The leaves of the dendrogram are individual nodes.

== See also ==
- Closeness
- Hierarchical clustering
- Modularity
