= Spanning tree (disambiguation) =

Spanning tree is a term in the mathematical field of graph theory

Spanning tree may also refer to:

- Spanning Tree Protocol, a network protocol for Ethernet networks
  - Multiple Spanning Tree Protocol

== See also ==
- Minimum spanning tree
  - Capacitated minimum spanning tree
  - Distributed minimum spanning tree
  - Euclidean minimum spanning tree
  - k-minimum spanning tree
  - Kinetic minimum spanning tree
  - Random minimum spanning tree
  - Rectilinear minimum spanning tree
- Degree-constrained spanning tree
- Maximum leaf spanning tree
- Minimum degree spanning tree
- Shortest total path length spanning tree
- Kruskal's algorithm, a minimum-spanning-tree algorithm
