= Random graph =

Graph generated by a random process

In mathematics, random graph is the general term to refer to probability distributions over graphs. Random graphs may be described simply by a probability distribution, or by a random process which generates them. The theory of random graphs lies at the intersection between graph theory and probability theory. From a mathematical perspective, random graphs are used to answer questions about the properties of typical graphs. Its practical applications are found in all areas in which complex networks need to be modeled – many random graph models are thus known, mirroring the diverse types of complex networks encountered in different areas. In a mathematical context, random graph refers almost exclusively to the Erdős–Rényi random graph model. In other contexts, any graph model may be referred to as a random graph.

== Models ==
A random graph is obtained by starting with a set of n isolated vertices and adding successive edges between them at random. The aim of the study in this field is to determine at what stage a particular property of the graph is likely to arise. Different random graph models produce different probability distributions on graphs. Most commonly studied is the one proposed by Edgar Gilbert but often called the Erdős–Rényi model, denoted G(n,p). In it, every possible edge occurs independently with probability 0 < p < 1. The probability of obtaining any one particular random graph with m edges is $p^m (1-p)^{N-m}$ with the notation $N = \tbinom{n}{2}$.

A closely related model, also called the Erdős–Rényi model and denoted G(n,M), assigns equal probability to all graphs with exactly M edges. With 0 ≤ M ≤ N, G(n,M) has $\tbinom{N}{M}$ elements and every element occurs with probability $1/\tbinom{N}{M}$. The G(n,M) model can be viewed as a snapshot at a particular time (M) of the random graph process $\tilde{G}_n$, a stochastic process that starts with n vertices and no edges, and at each step adds one new edge chosen uniformly from the set of missing edges.

If instead we start with an infinite set of vertices, and again let every possible edge occur independently with probability 0 < p < 1, then we get an object G called an infinite random graph. Except in the trivial cases when p is 0 or 1, such a G almost surely has the following property:

Given any n + m elements $a_1,\ldots, a_n,b_1,\ldots, b_m \in V$, there is a vertex c in V that is adjacent to each of $a_1,\ldots, a_n$ and is not adjacent to any of $b_1,\ldots, b_m$.

It turns out that if the vertex set is countable then there is, up to isomorphism, only a single graph with this property, namely the Rado graph. Thus any countably infinite random graph is almost surely the Rado graph, which for this reason is sometimes called simply the random graph. However, the analogous result is not true for uncountable graphs, of which there are many (nonisomorphic) graphs satisfying the above property.

Another model, which generalizes Gilbert's random graph model, is the random dot-product model. A random dot-product graph associates with each vertex a real vector. The probability of an edge uv between any vertices u and v is some function of the dot product u • v of their respective vectors.

The network probability matrix models random graphs through edge probabilities, which represent the probability $p_{i,j}$ that a given edge $e_{i,j}$ exists for a specified time period. This model is extensible to directed and undirected; weighted and unweighted; and static or dynamic graphs structure.

For M ≃ pN, where N is the maximal number of edges possible, the two most widely used models, G(n,M) and G(n,p), are almost interchangeable.

Random regular graphs form a special case, with properties that may differ from random graphs in general. To fill this gap, the Kim-Vu sandwich theorem (proposed in 2004 and fully proven in 2025 by Natalie Behagh, Daniel Ilkovic, and Richard Montgomery) proves that a random $d$-regular graph can be tightly “sandwiched” with high probability between two independent bipartite random graphs, $G(n, p1) \ and \ (G(n, p2)$. This will allow to easily extend the well-known properties of standard random graphs to more complex graph models.

Once we have a model of random graphs, every function on graphs, becomes a random variable. The study of this model is to determine if, or at least estimate the probability that, a property may occur.

== Terminology ==
The term 'almost every' in the context of random graphs refers to a sequence of spaces and probabilities, such that the error probabilities tend to zero.

== Properties ==
The theory of random graphs studies typical properties of random graphs, those that hold with high probability for graphs drawn from a particular distribution. For example, we might ask for a given value of $n$ and $p$ what the probability is that $G(n,p)$ is connected. In studying such questions, researchers often concentrate on the asymptotic behavior of random graphs—the values that various probabilities converge to as $n$ grows very large. Percolation theory characterizes the connectedness of random graphs, especially infinitely large ones.

Percolation is related to the robustness of the graph (called also network). Given a random graph of $n$ nodes and an average degree $\langle k\rangle$. Next we remove randomly a fraction $1-p$ of nodes and leave only a fraction $p$. There exists a critical percolation threshold $p_c=\tfrac{1}{\langle k\rangle}$ below which the network becomes fragmented while above $p_c$ a giant connected component exists.

Localized percolation refers to removing a node its neighbors, next nearest neighbors etc. until a fraction of $1-p$ of nodes from the network is removed. It was shown that for random graph with Poisson distribution of degrees $p_c=\tfrac{1}{\langle k\rangle}$ exactly as for random removal.

Random graphs are widely used in the probabilistic method, where one tries to prove the existence of graphs with certain properties. The existence of a property on a random graph can often imply, via the Szemerédi regularity lemma, the existence of that property on almost all graphs.

In random regular graphs, $G(n,r-reg)$ are the set of $r$-regular graphs with $r = r(n)$ such that $n$ and $m$ are the natural numbers, $3 \le r < n$, and $rn = 2m$ is even.

The degree sequence of a graph $G$ in $G^n$ depends only on the number of edges in the sets

$$V_n^{(2)} = \left \{ij \ : \ 1 \leq j \leq n, i \neq j \right \} \subset V^{(2)}, \qquad  i=1, \cdots, n.$$

If edges, $M$ in a random graph, $G_M$ is large enough to ensure that almost every $G_M$ has minimum degree at least 1, then almost every $G_M$ is connected and, if $n$ is even, almost every $G_M$ has a perfect matching. In particular, the moment the last isolated vertex vanishes in almost every random graph, the graph becomes connected.

Almost every graph process on an even number of vertices with the edge raising the minimum degree to 1 or a random graph with slightly more than $\tfrac{n}{4}\log(n)$ edges and with probability close to 1 ensures that the graph has a complete matching, with exception of at most one vertex.

For some constant $c$, almost every labeled graph with $n$ vertices and at least $cn\log(n)$ edges is Hamiltonian. With the probability tending to 1, the particular edge that increases the minimum degree to 2 makes the graph Hamiltonian.

Properties of random graph may change or remain invariant under graph transformations. Mashaghi A. et al., for example, demonstrated that a transformation which converts random graphs to their edge-dual graphs (or line graphs) produces an ensemble of graphs with nearly the same degree distribution, but with degree correlations and a significantly higher clustering coefficient.

== Colouring ==
Given a random graph G of order n with the vertex V(G) = {1, ..., n}, by the greedy algorithm on the number of colors, the vertices can be colored with colors 1, 2, ... (vertex 1 is colored 1, vertex 2 is colored 1 if it is not adjacent to vertex 1, otherwise it is colored 2, etc.). The number of proper colorings of random graphs given a number of q colors, called its chromatic polynomial, remains unknown so far. The scaling of zeros of the chromatic polynomial of random graphs with parameters n and the number of edges m or the connection probability p has been studied empirically using an algorithm based on symbolic pattern matching.

== Random trees ==
A random tree is a tree or arborescence that is formed by a stochastic process. In a large range of random graphs of order n and size M(n) the distribution of the number of tree components of order k is asymptotically Poisson. Types of random trees include uniform spanning tree, random minimum spanning tree, random binary tree, treap, rapidly exploring random tree, Brownian tree, and random forest.

== Conditional random graphs ==
Consider a given random graph model defined on the probability space $(\Omega, \mathcal{F}, P)$ and let $\mathcal{P}(G) : \Omega \rightarrow R^{m}$ be a real valued function which assigns to each graph in $\Omega$ a vector of m properties. For a fixed $\mathbf{p} \in R^{m}$, conditional random graphs are models in which the probability measure $P$ assigns zero probability to all graphs such that $\mathcal{P}(G) \neq \mathbf{p}$.

Special cases are conditionally uniform random graphs, where $P$ assigns equal probability to all the graphs having specified properties. They can be seen as a generalization of the Erdős–Rényi model G(n,M), when the conditioning information is not necessarily the number of edges M, but whatever other arbitrary graph property $\mathcal{P}(G)$. In this case very few analytical results are available and simulation is required to obtain empirical distributions of average properties.

== History ==
The earliest use of a random graph model was by Helen Hall Jennings and Jacob Moreno in 1938 where a "chance sociogram" (a directed Erdős-Rényi model) was considered in studying comparing the fraction of reciprocated links in their network data with the random model. Another use, under the name "random net", was by Ray Solomonoff and Anatol Rapoport in 1951, using a model of directed graphs with fixed out-degree and randomly chosen attachments to other vertices.

The Erdős–Rényi model of random graphs was first defined by Paul Erdős and Alfréd Rényi in their 1959 paper "On Random Graphs" and independently by Gilbert in his paper "Random graphs".

== See also ==
- Bose–Einstein condensation: a network theory approach – Model in network science
- Cavity method – Mathematical method in statistical physics
- Complex networks – Network with non-trivial topological features
- Dual-phase evolution – Process that drives self-organization within complex adaptive systems
- Erdős–Rényi model – Two closely related models for generating random graphs
- Exponential random graph model – Statistical models for network analysis
- Graph theory – Area of discrete mathematics
- Interdependent networks – Subfield of network science
- Network science – Academic field
- Percolation – Filtration of fluids through porous materials
- Percolation theory – Mathematical theory on behavior of connected clusters in a random graph
- Random graph theory of gelation – Mathematical theory for sol–gel processes
- Regular graph – Graph where each vertex has the same number of neighbors
- Scale free network – Network whose degree distribution follows a power law
- Semilinear response – Extension of linear response theory in mesoscopic regimes
- Stochastic block model – Concept in network science
- Lancichinetti–Fortunato–Radicchi benchmark – Algorithm
