= Minimum degree spanning tree =

Graph theory concept

In graph theory, a minimum degree spanning tree is a subset of the edges of a connected graph that connects all the vertices together, without any cycles, and its maximum degree of its vertices as small as possible. That is, it is a spanning tree whose maximum degree is minimal.

The decision problem is: Given a graph G and an integer k, does G have a spanning tree such that no vertex has degree greater than k? This is also known as the degree-constrained spanning tree problem.

== Algorithms ==
Finding the minimum degree spanning tree of an undirected graph is NP-hard. This can be shown by constructing a reduction from the Hamiltonian path problem. For directed graphs, finding the minimum degree spanning tree is also NP-hard.

R. Krishman and B. Raghavachari (2001) have a quasi-polynomial time approximation algorithm to solve the problem for directed graphs.

M. Haque, Md. R. Uddin, and Md. A. Kashem (2007) found a linear time algorithm that can find the minimum degree spanning tree of series-parallel graphs with small degrees.

G. Yao, D. Zhu, H. Li, and S. Ma (2008) found a polynomial time algorithm that can find the minimum degree spanning tree of directed acyclic graphs.
