= Good spanning tree =

Concept in graph theory

Conditions of good spanning tree

In the mathematical field of graph theory, a good spanning tree $T$ of an embedded planar graph $G$ is a rooted spanning tree of $G$ whose non-tree edges satisfy the following conditions.

- there is no non-tree edge $(u,v)$ where $u$ and $v$ lie on a path from the root of $T$ to a leaf,
- the edges incident to a vertex $v$ can be divided by three sets $X_v, Y_v$ and $Z_v$, where,
  - $X_v$ is a set of non-tree edges, they terminate in red zone
  - $Y_v$ is a set of tree edges, they are children of $v$
  - $Z_v$ is a set of non-tree edges, they terminate in green zone

== Formal definition ==
An illustration for $X_v , Y_v$ and $Z_v$ sets of edges

Let $G_\phi$ be a plane graph. Let $T$ be a rooted spanning tree of $G_\phi$. Let $P(r,v)=(r=u_1), u_2, \ldots, (v=u_k)$ be the path in $T$ from the root $r$ to a vertex $v\ne r$. The path $P(r,v)$ divides the children of $u_i$, $(1\le i < k)$, except $u_{i+1}$, into two groups; the left group $L$ and the right group $R$. A child $x$ of $u_i$ is in group $L$ and denoted by $u_{i}^L$ if the edge $(u_i,x)$ appears before the edge $(u_i, u_{i+1})$ in clockwise ordering of the edges incident to $u_i$ when the ordering is started from the edge $(u_i,u_{i+1})$. Similarly, a child $x$ of $u_i$ is in the group $R$ and denoted by $u_{i}^R$ if the edge $(u_i,x)$ appears after the edge $(u_i, u_{i+1})$ in clockwise order of the edges incident to $u_i$ when the ordering is started from the edge $(u_i,u_{i+1})$. The tree $T$ is called a good spanning tree of $G_\phi$ if every vertex $v$ $(v\ne r)$ of $G_\phi$ satisfies the following two conditions with respect to $P(r,v)$.

- [Cond1] $G_\phi$ does not have a non-tree edge $(v,u_i)$, $i<k$; and
- [Cond2] the edges of $G_\phi$ incident to the vertex $v$ excluding $(u_{k-1},v)$ can be partitioned into three disjoint (possibly empty) sets $X_v,Y_v$ and $Z_v$ satisfying the following conditions (a)-(c)
  - (a) Each of $X_v$ and $Z_v$ is a set of consecutive non-tree edges and $Y_v$ is a set of consecutive tree edges.
  - (b) Edges of set $X_v$, $Y_v$ and $Z_v$ appear clockwise in this order from the edge $(u_{k-1}, v)$.
  - (c) For each edge $(v,v')\in X_v$, $v'$ is contained in $T_{u_i^L}$, $i<k$, and for each edge $(v,v')\in Z_v$, $v'$ is contained in $T_{u_i^R}$, $i<k$.
    A plane graph $G_\phi$ (top), a good spanning tree $T$ of $G_\phi$ (down) solid edges are part of good spanning tree and dotted edges are non-tree edges in $G_\phi$ with respect to $T$.

== Applications ==
In monotone drawing of graphs, in 2-visibility representation of graphs.

== Finding good spanning tree ==
Every planar graph $G$ has an embedding $G_\phi$ such that $G_\phi$ contains a good spanning tree. A good spanning tree and a suitable embedding can be found from $G$ in linear-time. Not all embeddings of $G$ contain a good spanning tree.

== See also ==
- Spanning tree
- Schnyder realizer
