= Matroid parity problem =

Largest independent set of paired elements

An instance of the matroid parity problem: given a graph with colored edges, having exactly two edges per color, find a forest (an independent set of the graphic matroid) with as many edges as possible that again has exactly two edges per color.

In combinatorial optimization, the matroid parity problem is a problem of finding the largest independent set of paired elements in a matroid, a structure that abstracts and generalizes the notion of linear independence in vector spaces. The problem was formulated by Lawler (1976) as a common generalization of graph matching and matroid intersection. It is also known as polymatroid matching, or the matchoid problem.

Matroid parity can be solved in polynomial time for linear matroids. However, it is NP-hard for certain compactly-represented matroids, and requires more than a polynomial number of steps in the matroid oracle model.

Applications of matroid parity algorithms include finding large planar subgraphs and finding graph embeddings of maximum genus. Matroid parity algorithms can also be used to find connected vertex covers and feedback vertex sets in graphs of maximum degree three.

== Formulation ==
A matroid can be defined from a finite set of elements and from a nonempty family of independent sets, subject to the following constraints:

- Every subset of an independent set must be independent.
- If $S$ and $T$ are independent sets, with $|T|>|S|$, then there exists an element $t\in T$ such that $S\cup\{t\}$ is independent.

Examples of matroids include the linear matroids (in which the elements are vectors in a vector space, with linear independence), the graphic matroids (in which the elements are edges in an undirected graph, independent when they contain no cycle), and the partition matroids (in which the elements belong to a family of disjoint sets, and are independent when they contain at most one element in each set). Graphic matroids and partition matroids are special cases of linear matroids.

In the matroid parity problem, the input consists of a matroid together with a pairing on its elements, so that each element belongs to one pair. The goal is to find a subset of the pairs, as large as possible, so that the union of the pairs in the chosen subset is independent. In another seemingly more general variation, the allowable pairs form a graph rather than having only one pair per element, and the goal is to find as many disjoint pairs as possible so that their union is independent. However, this variation is equivalent: If an element appears in more than one pair, one could modify the matroid by making multiple copies of that element, with only one copy allowed in an independent set, and use different copies of the element in different pairs. Repeating this replacement for all elements that appear in more than one pair would produce an equivalent instance of the matroid parity problem with each element belonging to only one pair.

This problem was originally formulated in 1976 by Eugene Lawler. It generalized two previously-studied problems, graph matching and matroid intersection (see § Applications).

== Algorithms ==
The matroid parity problem for linear matroids can be solved by a randomized algorithm in time $O(nr^{\omega-1})$, where $n$ is the number of elements of the matroid, $r$ is its rank (the size of the largest independent set), and $\omega$ is the exponent in the time bounds for fast matrix multiplication. In particular, using a matrix multiplication algorithm of Virginia Vassilevska Williams et al., it can be solved in time $O(nr^{1.3716})$. Without using fast matrix multiplication, the linear matroid parity problem can be solved in time $O(nr^2)$. For instances with real numbers assigned as the weights of each element, it is also possible to find a minimum-weight solution to the matroid parity problem, or a maximum-weight paired independent set, in linear matroids, in time $O(n^3r)$.

These algorithms are based on a linear algebra formulation of the problem by Geelen & Iwata (2005). Suppose that an input to the problem consists of $m$ pairs of $r$-dimensional vectors (arranged as column vectors in a matrix $M$ of size $r\times 2m$). Then the number of pairs in the optimal solution is

$$\frac{1}{2}\operatorname{rank}\begin{pmatrix}0&M\\M^T&T\end{pmatrix} -m,$$

where $T$ is a block diagonal matrix whose blocks are $2\times 2$ submatrices of the form

$$\begin{pmatrix}0&t_i\\-t_i&0\end{pmatrix}$$

for a sequence of variables $t_1,\dots t_m$. The Schwartz–Zippel lemma can be used to test whether this matrix has full rank or not (that is, whether the solution has size $r/2$ or not), by assigning random values to the variables $t_i$ and testing whether the resulting matrix has determinant zero. By applying a greedy algorithm that removes pairs one at a time by setting their variables to zero as long as the matrix remains of full rank (maintaining the inverse matrix using the Sherman–Morrison formula to check the rank after each removal), one can find a solution whenever this test shows that it exists. Additional methods extend this algorithm to the case that the optimal solution to the matroid parity problem has fewer than $r/2$ pairs.

For graphic matroids, more efficient matroid parity algorithms are known, based on range searching data structures, with running time $O(mn\log^6 n)$ on graphs with $m$ vertices and $n$ edges. For simple graphs, $m$ is $O(n^2)$, but for multigraphs, it may be larger, so it is also of interest to have algorithms with smaller or no dependence on $m$ and worse dependence on $n$. In these cases, it is also possible to solve the graphic matroid parity problem in randomized expected time $O(n^4)$, or in time $O(n^3)$ when each pair of edges forms a path.

The matroid parity problem is NP-hard for certain compactly-represented matroids. Additionally, it requires more than a polynomial number of steps in the matroid oracle model, in which an algorithm is given access to an arbitrary matroid only through a subroutine that determines whether a given set is independent. Nevertheless, in these cases, it can still be approximated efficiently. Simple local search algorithms provide a polynomial-time approximation scheme for this problem, and find solutions whose size, as a fraction of the optimal solution size, is arbitrarily close to one. The algorithm starts with the empty set as its solution, and repeatedly attempts to increase the solution size by one by removing at most a constant number $C$ of pairs from the solution and replacing them by a different set with one more pair. When no more such moves are possible, the resulting solution is returned as the approximation to the optimal solution. To achieve an approximation ratio of $1-\epsilon$, it suffices to choose $C$ to be approximately $5^{\lceil 1/2\epsilon\rceil}$.

== Applications ==
Many other optimization problems can be formulated as linear matroid parity problems, and solved in polynomial time using this formulation.

=== Graph matching ===
A maximum matching in a graph is a subset of edges, no two sharing an endpoint, that is as large as possible. It can be formulated as a matroid parity problem in a partition matroid that has an element for each vertex-edge incidence in the graph. In this matroid, two elements are paired if they are the two incidences for the same edge as each other. A subset of elements is independent if it has at most one incidence for each vertex of the graph. The pairs of elements in a solution to the matroid parity problem for this matroid are the incidences between edges in a maximum matching and their endpoints. Conversely, any matroid parity problem on a partition matroid can be interpreted as a maximum matching problem on a graph whose vertices correspond to the sets of the partition and whose edges correspond to the paired elements of the parity problem. Because matching can be solved in polynomial time, so can matroid parity problems on partition matroids.

=== Matroid intersection ===
An instance of the matroid intersection problem consists of two matroids on the same set of elements; the goal is to find a subset of the elements that is as large as possible and is independent in both matroids. To formulate matroid intersection as a matroid parity problem, construct a new matroid whose elements are the disjoint union of two copies of the given elements, one for each input matroid. In the new matroid, a subset is independent if its restriction to each of the two copies is independent in each of the two matroids, respectively. Pair the elements of the new matroid so that each element is paired with its copy. The pairs of elements in a solution to the matroid parity problem for this matroid are the two copies of each element in a solution to the matroid intersection problem.

=== Large planar subgraphs ===
In an arbitrary graph, the problem of finding the largest set of triangles in a given graph, with no cycles other than the chosen triangles, can be formulated as a matroid parity problem on a graphic matroid whose elements are edges of the graph, with one pair of edges per triangle (duplicating edges if necessary when they belong to more than one triangle). The pairs of elements in a solution to the matroid parity problem for this matroid are the two edges in each triangle of an optimal set of triangles.

The same problem can also be described as one of finding the largest Berge-acyclic sub-hypergraph of a 3-uniform hypergraph. A hypergraph is a structure analogous to a graph but allowing more than two vertices per hyperedge. A hypergraph whose hyperedges are the triangles of the given graph has exactly three vertices per edge, making it 3-uniform. There are multiple incompatible definitions of cycles in hypergraphs; a Berge cycle is a cyclic sequence that alternates between vertices and hyperedges, without repeated vertices or hyperedges, and with each consecutive pair of a vertex and hyperedge incident to each other. For any Berge cycle in the hypergraph of triangles, the same cyclic sequence of vertices would form a cycle in the underlying graph. Thus, finding a largest set of hyperedges with no Berge cycle is the same thing as finding the largest set of triangles in the corresponding graph that has no cycle other than the selected triangles themselves.

A cactus graph is a graph in which each two cycles have at most one vertex in common. As a special case, the graphs in which each cycle is a triangle are necessarily cactus graphs. The largest triangular cactus in the given graph can then be found by adding additional edges from a spanning tree, without creating any new cycles, so that the resulting subgraph has the same connected components as the original graph. Cactus graphs are automatically planar graphs, and the problem of finding triangular cactus graphs forms the basis for the largest known approximation ratio for the problem of finding the largest planar subgraph of a given graph, an important step in planarization. The largest triangular cactus always has at least 4/9 the number of edges of the largest planar subgraph, improving the 1/3 approximation ratio obtained by using an arbitrary spanning tree.

=== Combinatorial rigidity ===
The Peaucellier–Lipkin linkage is an example of a framework of bars connected at their endpoints that is not rigid with the two pinned joints marked with "x": it can still flex as shown with one degree of freedom.

A framework of rigid bars in the Euclidean plane, connected at their endpoints at flexible joints, can be fixed into its given position in the plane by fixing the positions of some of its joints, pinning them in place. A set of joints that, when pinned down, make the framework infinitesimally rigid is called a pinning set. Infinitesimal rigidity disallows even infinitesimally small rigid motions. It is, in general, a stronger condition than being unable to move, but the two concepts are the same when the initial placement of the framework is in a suitably generic position. The size of the smallest pinning set is the pinning number of the framework.

Any framework determines a rigidity matrix having a row for each bar and two columns for each joint, one column for each of the joint's two coordinate dimensions. The nonzeros in the row for each edge lie in the columns for the edge's two endpoints, and equal the coordinate differences of the endpoints. This defines a linear matroid pairing problem in which the pairs of elements are the pairs of columns for each vertex, and in which a set of columns is independent if they are linearly independent as vectors. (This is different from the notion of independence in the rigidity matroid of the graph, which has the rows of the same matrix as its elements.) A set of paired columns is independent if and only if it comes from a set of joints that is complementary to a pinning set. Therefore, a minimum pinning set can be found by complementing the solution to this matroid pairing problem.

=== Maximum-genus embeddings ===
A Xuong tree whose complement has one odd component (red)

A cellular embedding of a given graph onto an oriented surface of the maximum possible genus can be obtained from a Xuong tree of the graph. For this problem, a cellular embedding is a drawing of the graph on the surface, without crossings, so that the faces of the surface (the parts of the surface that would be obtained by cutting it along all of the edges of the graph) are topological disks. A surface is oriented if it does not contain a Möbius strip. One way to describe a cellular embedding and the surface that it is embedded onto is to list, for each vertex of the graph, a cyclic order of the edges incident to that vertex, in their clockwise ordering around the vertex on the surface. This information can be used to find the boundary of each face, by tracing it from vertex to vertex. The surface itself can then be recovered, up to topological equivalence, by gluing together a collection of disks, one for each boundary traced in this way.

A Xuong tree is a spanning tree with the property that, in the subgraph of edges not in the tree, the number of connected components with an odd number of edges is as small as possible. The optimal embedding can then be obtained by pairing edges within each component and inserting each pair into an embedding, one pair at a time. As a base case for this insertion process, the Xuong tree itself is embedded onto a sphere (the only closed surface onto which it can be embedded), arbitrarily. Then, when adding each pair of remaining edges, there is a choice of how to add the edges into the cyclic orderings at their endpoints, and this choice can always be made in such a way that it increases the genus of the surface by one. The embedding resulting from this insertion process has the maximum genus possible.

To formulate the problem of finding a Xuong tree as a matroid parity problem, first subdivide each edge $e$ of the given graph into a path, with the length of the path equal to the number of other edges incident to $e$. Then, pair the edges of the subdivided graph, so that each pair of incident edges in the original graph is represented by a single pair of edges in the subdivided graph, and each edge in the subdivided graph is paired exactly once. Solve a matroid parity problem with the paired edges of the subdivided graph, using its cographic matroid. This is the dual matroid of a graphic matroid. In it, a subset of edges is independent if its removal does not separate the graph. Any spanning tree of the original graph that avoids the edges used in the matroid parity solution is necessarily a Xuong tree. Each pair selected in the solution can be used to increase the genus of the embedding, so the total genus is the number of selected pairs.

=== Connected vertex cover ===
Replacement of each vertex and edge of a cubic graph by a two-edge path, as used with matroid parity to find connected vertex covers and feedback vertex sets

A connected vertex cover in a graph is a subset of vertices whose induced subgraph is connected and includes an endpoint of every edge of the whole graph. It is NP-hard to find the smallest connected vertex cover in arbitrary graphs, or even in planar graphs of maximum degree four, but they can be found in polynomial time for graphs of maximum degree three. A simplified version of the algorithm applies to cubic graphs, graphs with exactly three edges incident to each vertex. It forms a new graph with each vertex and edge of the given graph replaced by paths of two paired edges. For a vertex $v$ of the given cubic graph, the three vertices of $v$'s replacement path form the three endpoints of the paths that replace the three edges incident to $v$.

A solution to the matroid parity problem for the cographic matroid of this path-replaced graph cannot use paths that replace edges, because removing the edges of this path would isolate the middle vertex of the path. Disconnecting this vertex violates the defining property of the cographic matroid that removing an independent set cannot disconnect the graph. Therefore, the solution must consist only of pairs of edges coming from vertices. More strongly, these pairs must come from vertices that form a non-separating independent set in the original graph. Any other paired edges would separate the expanded graph and form a dependent set in the cographic matroid. In any connected graph, the complement of a maximum non-separating independent set is a minimum connected vertex cover. In a graph of maximum degree three, some simple additional transformations reduce the problem to one on a cubic graph.

=== Feedback vertex set ===
A feedback vertex set in a graph is a subset of vertices that touches all cycles. In connected cubic graphs, this problem is closely related to connected vertex covers: the size of the minimum feedback set is exactly $c-n/2+1$ where $n$ is the number of vertices and $c$ is the size of a connected vertex cover. The same expansion of each vertex and each edge into a two-edge path, used for connected vertex covers, produces an expanded graph with paired edges. The matroid parity problem on the graphic matroid has an optimal solution that includes all of the pairs coming from edges of the original graph, together with pairs coming from a set of vertices complementary to a feedback vertex set. Complementing the set of selected vertices produces a minimum feedback vertex set. Again, this solution can be extended from cubic graphs to graphs of maximum degree three.

== Hardness ==
The clique problem, of finding a $k$-vertex complete subgraph in a given $n$-vertex graph $G$, can be transformed into an instance of matroid parity as follows. Construct a matroid on $2n$ elements, paired up so that there is one pair of elements per pair of vertices. Define a subset $S$ of these elements to be independent if it satisfies any one of the following three conditions:

- $S$ has fewer than $2k$ elements.
- $S$ has exactly $2k$ elements, but is not the union of $k$ pairs of elements.
- $S$ is the union of $k$ pairs of elements that form a clique in $G$.

(This is a paving matroid, a matroid in which there are no dependent sets smaller than the maximum independent sets.) Then there is a solution to the matroid parity problem for this matroid, of size $2k$, if and only if $G$ has a clique of size $k$. Since finding cliques of a given size is NP-complete, it follows that determining whether this type of matrix parity problem has a solution of size $2k$ is also NP-complete.

This problem transformation does not depend on the structure of the clique problem in any deep way, and would work for any other problem of finding size-$k$ subsets of a larger set that satisfy a computable test. By applying it to a randomly-permuted graph that contains exactly one clique of size $k$, and applying Yao's principle relating expected and average-case complexity, one can show that any deterministic or randomized algorithm for matroid parity that accesses its matroid only by independence tests needs to make an exponential number of tests.
