= Recursive tree =

Tree graph with nodes numbered in order of distance from the root

In graph theory, a recursive tree (i.e., unordered tree) is a labeled, rooted tree. A size-n recursive tree's vertices are labeled by distinct positive integers 1, 2, …, n, where the labels are strictly increasing starting at the root labeled 1. Recursive trees are non-planar, which means that the children of a particular vertex are not ordered; for example, the following two size-3 recursive trees are equivalent: _{3}/^{1}\_{2} = _{2}/^{1}\_{3}.

Recursive trees also appear in literature under the name Increasing Cayley trees.

== Properties ==
The number of size-n recursive trees is given by

$$T_n= (n-1)!. \,$$

Hence the exponential generating function T(z) of the sequence T_{n} is given by

$$T(z)= \sum_{n\ge 1} T_n \frac{z^n}{n!}=\log\left(\frac{1}{1-z}\right).$$

Combinatorically, a recursive tree can be interpreted as a root followed by an unordered sequence of recursive trees. Let F denote the family of recursive trees. Then

$$F= \circ + \frac{1}{1!}\cdot \circ \times F
+ \frac{1}{2!}\cdot \circ \times F* F
+ \frac{1}{3!}\cdot \circ \times F* F* F * \cdots
= \circ\times\exp(F),$$

where $\circ$ denotes the node labeled by 1, × the Cartesian product and $*$ the partition product for labeled objects.

By translation of the formal description one obtains the differential equation for T(z)

$$T'(z)= \exp(T(z)),$$

with T(0) = 0.

== Bijections ==
There are bijective correspondences between recursive trees of size n and permutations of size n − 1.

== Applications ==
Recursive trees can be generated using a simple stochastic process. Such random recursive trees are used as simple models for epidemics.
