= Random tree =

In mathematics and computer science, a random tree is a tree or arborescence that is formed by a stochastic process. Types of random trees include:

- Uniform spanning tree, a spanning tree of a given graph in which each different tree is equally likely to be selected
- Random minimal spanning tree, spanning trees of a graph formed by choosing random edge weights and using the minimum spanning tree for those weights
- Random binary tree, binary trees with various random distributions, including trees formed by random insertion orders, and trees that are uniformly distributed with a given number of nodes
- Random recursive tree, increasingly labelled trees, which can be generated using a simple stochastic growth rule.
- Treap or randomized binary search tree, a data structure that uses random choices to simulate a random binary tree for non-random update sequences
- Rapidly exploring random tree, a fractal space-filling pattern used as a data structure for searching high-dimensional spaces
- Brownian tree, a fractal tree structure created by diffusion-limited aggregation processes
- Random forest, a machine-learning classifier based on choosing random subsets of variables for each tree and using the most frequent tree output as the overall classification
- Branching process, a model of a population in which each individual has a random number of children

== See also ==
- Lightning tree
