= Random regular graph =

A random r-regular graph is a graph selected from $\mathcal{G}_{n,r}$, which denotes the probability space of all r-regular graphs on $n$ vertices, where $3 \le r < n$ and $nr$ is even. It is therefore a particular kind of random graph, but the regularity restriction significantly alters the properties that will hold, since most graphs are not regular.

== Properties of random regular graphs ==
As with more general random graphs, it is possible to prove that certain properties of random $m$–regular graphs hold asymptotically almost surely. In particular, for $r \ge 3$, a random r-regular graph of large size is asymptotically almost surely r-connected. In other words, although $r$–regular graphs with connectivity less than $r$ exist, the probability of selecting such a graph tends to 0 as $n$ increases.

If $\epsilon > 0$ is a positive constant, and $d$ is the least integer satisfying

$(r-1)^{d-1} \ge (2 + \epsilon)rn \ln n$

then, asymptotically almost surely, a random r-regular graph has diameter at most d. There is also a (more complex) lower bound on the diameter of r-regular graphs, so that almost all r-regular graphs (of the same size) have almost the same diameter.

The distribution of the number of short cycles is also known: for fixed $m \ge 3$, let $Y_3,Y_4,...Y_m$ be the number of cycles of lengths up to $m$. Then the $Y_i$are asymptotically independent Poisson random variables with means

$\lambda_i=\frac{(r-1)^i}{2i}$

== Algorithms for random regular graphs ==
It is non-trivial to implement the random selection of r-regular graphs efficiently and in an unbiased way, since most graphs are not regular. The pairing model (also configuration model) is a method which takes nr points, and partitions them into n buckets with r points in each of them. Taking a random matching of the nr points, and then contracting the r points in each bucket into a single vertex, yields an r-regular graph or multigraph. If this object has no multiple edges or loops (i.e. it is a graph), then it is the required result. If not, a restart is required.

A refinement of this method was developed by Brendan McKay and Nicholas Wormald.
