= Degree-constrained spanning tree =

Type of spanning tree

A spanning tree can be constructed where the vertex with the highest degree is 3 (thus, a max degree 3 tree).

In graph theory, a degree-constrained spanning tree is a spanning tree where the maximum vertex degree is limited to a certain constant k. The degree-constrained spanning tree problem is to determine whether a particular graph has such a spanning tree for a particular k.

== Formal definition ==
Input: n-node undirected graph G(V,E); positive integer k < n.

Question: Does G have a spanning tree in which no node has degree greater than k?

== NP-completeness ==
This problem is NP-complete (Garey & Johnson 1979). This can be shown by a reduction from the Hamiltonian path problem. It remains NP-complete even if k is fixed to a value ≥ 2. If the problem is defined as the degree must be ≤ k, the k = 2 case of degree-confined spanning tree is the Hamiltonian path problem.

== Degree-constrained minimum spanning tree ==
On a weighted graph, a Degree-constrained minimum spanning tree (DCMST) is a degree-constrained spanning tree in which the sum of its edges has the minimum possible sum. Finding a DCMST is an NP-Hard problem.

Heuristic algorithms that can solve the problem in polynomial time have been proposed, including Genetic and Ant-Based Algorithms.

== Approximation Algorithm ==
Fürer & Raghavachari (1994) give an iterative polynomial time algorithm which, given a graph $G$, returns a spanning tree with maximum degree no larger than $\Delta^* + 1$, where $\Delta^*$ is the minimum possible maximum degree over all spanning trees. Thus, if $k = \Delta^*$, such an algorithm will either return a spanning tree of maximum degree $k$ or $k+1$.

== Known cases ==
For the complete bipartite graph $K_{m,n}$ where $m \le n$:

$$\Delta^*(K_{m,n}) = 1 + \left\lceil \frac{n-1}{m} \right\rceil$$
