= Kirchhoff's theorem =

On the number of spanning trees in a graph

In the mathematical field of graph theory, Kirchhoff's theorem or Kirchhoff's matrix tree theorem is a theorem about the number of spanning trees in a graph. It states that this number can be computed as any cofactor of the graph's Laplacian matrix. This shows in particular that the number of spanning trees can be computed from the graph data in polynomial time. Kirchhoff's theorem is a generalization of Cayley's formula which provides the number of spanning trees in a complete graph. The theorem is named after the German mathematician Gustav Kirchhoff, who published it in 1847. An English translation of Kirchhoff's paper was published in 1958.

== Definitions and statement ==
Let G be a simple, undirected graph. A spanning tree of G is a subgraph of G that is a tree with the same vertex set as G. The Laplacian matrix L of G is the difference between the graph's degree matrix (the diagonal matrix of vertex degrees) and its adjacency matrix (a (0,1)-matrix with 1's at places corresponding to entries where the vertices are adjacent and 0's otherwise). A cofactor of L is obtained by deleting a row (say the i-th row) and a column (say the j-th column) of L, taking the determinant of that smaller matrix, and multiplying it with (-1)^{i+j}.

Kirchhoff's theorem states that the number of spanning trees of the graph is equal to any cofactor of the graph's Laplacian matrix. (In particular, all these cofactors are equal.)

== Example ==
This graph has eight spanning trees, shown in orange on the right. The Matrix-Tree Theorem computes the number of spanning trees from the graph's Laplacian matrix.

First, construct the Laplacian matrix L for the example diamond graph G (see image on the right):

$$L = \left[\begin{array}{rrrr}
2 & -1 & -1 & 0 \\
-1 & 3 & -1 & -1 \\
-1 & -1 & 3 & -1 \\
0 & -1 & -1 & 2
\end{array}\right].$$

Next, construct a matrix L^{*} by deleting any row and any column from L. For example, deleting row 1 and column 1 yields

$$L^\ast = \left[\begin{array}{rrr}
3 & -1 & -1 \\
-1 & 3 & -1 \\
-1 & -1 & 2
\end{array}\right].$$

Finally, take the determinant of L^{*}, which results in 8. The number of spanning trees of G, shown on the right, is also 8.

== Proof outline ==
(The proof below is based on the Cauchy–Binet formula. An elementary induction argument for Kirchhoff's theorem can be found on page 654 of Moore (2011).)

First notice that the Laplacian matrix has the property that the sum of its entries across any row and any column is 0. Thus we can transform any minor into any other minor by adding rows and columns, switching them, and multiplying a row or a column by −1. Thus the cofactors are the same up to sign, and it can be verified that, in fact, they have the same sign.

We proceed to show that the determinant of the minor M_{11} is the number of spanning trees. Let n be the number of vertices of the graph, and m the number of its edges. The incidence matrix E is an n-by-m matrix, which may be defined as follows: suppose that (i, j) is the kth edge of the graph, and that i < j. Then E_{ik} = 1, E_{jk} = −1, and all other entries in column k are 0 (see oriented incidence matrix for understanding this modified incidence matrix E). For the preceding example (with n = 4 and m = 5):

$$E = \left[ \begin{array}{rrrrr}
1 &  1 &  0 &  0 &  0 \\
-1 &  0 &  1 &  1 &  0 \\
0 & -1 & -1 &  0 &  1 \\
0 &  0 &  0 & -1 & -1
\end{array} \right] .$$

Recall that the Laplacian L can be factored into the product of the incidence matrix and its transpose, i.e., L = EE^{T}. Furthermore, let F be the matrix E with its first row deleted, so that FF^{T} = M_{11}.

Now the Cauchy–Binet formula allows us to write

$$\det\left(M_{11}\right) = \sum_S \det\left(F_S\right)\det\left(F_S^{\mathrm{T}}\right) = \sum_S \det\left(F_S\right)^2$$

where S ranges across subsets of [m] of size n − 1, and F_{S} denotes the (n − 1)-by-(n − 1) matrix whose columns are those of F with index in S. Then every S specifies n − 1 edges of the original graph, and it can be shown that if those edges induce a spanning tree then the determinant of F_{S} is +1 or −1, and if they do not induce a spanning tree then the determinant is 0. This completes the proof.

== Particular cases and generalizations ==
=== Cayley's formula ===
Cayley's formula follows from Kirchhoff's theorem as a special case, since every vector with 1 in one place, −1 in another place, and 0 elsewhere is an eigenvector of the Laplacian matrix of the complete graph, with the corresponding eigenvalue being n. These vectors together span a space of dimension n − 1, so there are no other non-zero eigenvalues.

Alternatively, note that as Cayley's formula gives the number of distinct labeled trees of a complete graph K_{n} we need to compute any cofactor of the Laplacian matrix of K_{n}. The Laplacian matrix in this case is

$$\begin{bmatrix}
n-1 & -1      & \cdots & -1      \\
-1  & n-1     & \cdots & -1      \\
\vdots & \vdots& \ddots & \vdots \\
-1 & -1      & \cdots & n-1      \\
\end{bmatrix}.$$

Any cofactor of the above matrix is n^{n}^{−2}, which is Cayley's formula.

=== Formulation using eigenvalues of the Laplacian matrix ===
The theorem can be formulated in terms of the eigenvalues of the Laplacian. These eigenvalues are always non-negative and one of them is zero. For a given graph G with n vertices, let 0 = λ_{0} ≤λ_{1} ≤ λ_{2} ≤...≤ λ_{n}_{−1} be the eigenvalues of its Laplacian matrix. Then the number t(G) of spanning trees of G is

$$t(G) = \frac{1}{n} \lambda_1\lambda_2\cdots\lambda_{n-1}\,.$$

=== Kirchhoff's theorem for multigraphs ===
Kirchhoff's theorem holds for multigraphs as well; the matrix L is modified as follows:

- The entry q_{i,j} equals −m, where m is the number of edges between i and j;
- when counting the degree of a vertex, all loops are excluded.

Cayley's formula for a complete multigraph is m^{n−1}(n^{n−1}−(n−1)n^{n−2}) by same methods produced above, since a simple graph is a multigraph with m = 1.

=== Explicit enumeration of spanning trees ===
Kirchhoff's theorem can be strengthened by altering the definition of the Laplacian matrix. Rather than merely counting edges emanating from each vertex or connecting a pair of vertices, label each edge with an indeterminate and let the (i, j)-th entry of the modified Laplacian matrix be the sum over the indeterminates corresponding to edges between the i-th and j-th vertices when i does not equal j, and the negative sum over all indeterminates corresponding to edges emanating from the i-th vertex when i equals j.

The determinant of the modified Laplacian matrix by deleting any row and column (similar to finding the number of spanning trees from the original Laplacian matrix), above is then a homogeneous polynomial (the Kirchhoff polynomial) in the indeterminates corresponding to the edges of the graph. After collecting terms and performing all possible cancellations, each monomial in the resulting expression represents a spanning tree consisting of the edges corresponding to the indeterminates appearing in that monomial. In this way, one can obtain explicit enumeration of all the spanning trees of the graph simply by computing the determinant.

For a proof of this version of the theorem see Bollobás (1998).

==== Random selection from all spanning trees ====
A spanning tree can be selected uniformly at random from the total number of spanning trees via Wilson's algorithm or, less efficiently, via the Aldous–Broder algorithm.

=== Matroids ===
The spanning trees of a graph form the bases of a graphic matroid, so Kirchhoff's theorem provides a formula for the number of bases in a graphic matroid. The same method may also be used to determine the number of bases in regular matroids, a generalization of the graphic matroids (Maurer 1976).

=== Kirchhoff's theorem for directed multigraphs ===
Kirchhoff's theorem can be modified to give the number of oriented spanning trees in directed multigraphs. The matrix Q is constructed as follows:

- The entry q_{i,j} for distinct i and j equals −m, where m is the number of edges from i to j;
- The entry q_{i,i} equals the indegree of i minus the number of loops at i.

The number of oriented spanning trees rooted at a vertex i is the determinant of the matrix gotten by removing the ith row and column of Q

=== Counting spanning k-component forests ===
Kirchhoff's theorem can be generalized to count k-component spanning forests in an unweighted graph. A k-component spanning forest is a subgraph with k connected components that contains all vertices and is cycle-free, i.e., there is at most one path between each pair of vertices. Given such a forest F with connected components $F_1, \dots, F_k$, define its weight $w(F) = |V(F_1)| \cdot \dots \cdot |V(F_k)|$ to be the product of the number of vertices in each component. Then

$$\sum_F w(F) = q_k,$$

where the sum is over all k-component spanning forests and $q_k$ is the coefficient of $x^k$ of the polynomial

$$(x+\lambda_1) \dots (x+\lambda_{n-1}) x.$$

The last factor in the polynomial is due to the zero eigenvalue $\lambda_n=0$. More explicitly, the number $q_k$ can be computed as

$$q_k = \sum_{\{i_1, \dots, i_{n-k}\}\subset\{1\dots n-1\}} \lambda_{i_1} \dots \lambda_{i_{n-k}}.$$

where the sum is over all (n − k)-element subsets of $\{1, \dots, n\}$. For example

$$\begin{align}
q_{n-1} &= \lambda_1 + \dots + \lambda_{n-1} = \operatorname{tr} Q = 2|E| \\
q_{n-2} &= \lambda_1\lambda_2 + \lambda_1 \lambda_3 + \dots + \lambda_{n-2} \lambda_{n-1} \\
q_2 &= \lambda_1 \dots \lambda_{n-2} + \lambda_1 \dots \lambda_{n-3} \lambda_{n-1} + \dots + \lambda_2 \dots \lambda_{n-1}\\
q_1 &= \lambda_1 \dots \lambda_{n-1}
\end{align}$$

Since a spanning forest with n−1 components corresponds to a single edge, the k = n − 1 case states that the sum of the eigenvalues of Q is twice the number of edges. The k = 1 case corresponds to the original Kirchhoff theorem since the weight of every spanning tree is n.

The proof can be done analogously to the proof of Kirchhoff's theorem. An invertible $(n-k) \times (n-k)$ submatrix of the incidence matrix corresponds bijectively to a k-component spanning forest with a choice of vertex for each component.

The coefficients $q_k$ are up to sign the coefficients of the characteristic polynomial of Q.

== See also ==
- List of topics related to trees
- BEST theorem
- Markov chain tree theorem
- Minimum spanning tree
- Prüfer sequence
