= Edge list =

Graph data structure

An edge list is a data structure used to represent a graph as a list of its edges. An (unweighted) edge is defined by its start and end vertex, so each edge may be represented by two numbers. The entire edge list may be represented as a two-column matrix. An edge list may be considered a variation on an adjacency list which is represented as a length $|V|$ array of lists. Since each edge contains just two or three numbers, the total space for an edge list is $\Theta (|E|)$.
