= Augmented tree-based routing =

Augmented tree-based routing (ATR) protocol, first proposed in 2007, is a multi-path DHT-based routing protocol for scalable networks. ATR resorts to an augmented tree-based address space structure and a hierarchical multi-path routing protocol in order to gain scalability and good resilience against node failure/mobility and link congestion/instability.

== See also ==
- List of ad hoc routing protocols
- Mobile ad hoc network
