= Ding-Zhu Du =

American computer scientist

- Scientific career
- Fields: Computer algorithms
- Workplaces: University of Texas at Dallas
- Thesis: Generalized Complexity Cores And Levelability Of Intractable Sets (1985)
- Doctoral advisor: Ronald V. Book
- Doctoral students: Mihaela Cardei; Maggie Cheng; Yingshu Li
- Website: www.utdallas.edu/~dzdu/

Ding-Zhu Du is a professor in the Department of Computer Science at The University of Texas at Dallas. He is known for his research on the Euclidean minimum Steiner trees, including an attempted proof of the Gilbert–Pollak conjecture on the Steiner ratio, and the existence of a polynomial-time heuristic with a performance ratio bigger than the Steiner ratio.

== Education ==
Ding-Zhu Du received his M.Sc in operations research from the Chinese Academy of Sciences in 1985. He received his Ph.D. in mathematics with research area in theoretical computer science from the University of California, Santa Barbara in 1984.

== Career ==
Early in his career he published two claimed results on the Euclidean minimum Steiner trees, a proof of the Gilbert–Pollak conjecture on the Steiner ratio, and the existence of a polynomial-time heuristic with a performance ratio bigger than the Steiner ratio. The proof of the Gilbert–Pollak conjecture was later found to have gaps, leaving the problem unsolved.

He was program director for CISE/CCF, National Science Foundation, US, 2002-2005; professor, Department of Computer Science, University of Minnesota, 1991-2005; and assistant professor, Department of Mathematics, Massachusetts Institute of Technology, 1986-1987.

He has been active in research on design and analysis of approximation algorithm for 30 years. And over these years he has published 177 journal articles, 60 conference and workshop papers, 22 editorship, 9 reference works and 11 informal publications.

== Books published ==
- Theory of Computational Complexity.
- Problem Solving in Automata, Languages, and Complexity.
- Pooling Designs and Nonadaptive Group Testing.
- Mathematical Theory of Optimization.
- Combinatorial Group Testing and Its Applications (2nd Edition).
- Connected Dominating Set: Theory and Applications.
- Design and Analysis of Approximation Algorithms.
- Steiner Tree Problems In Computer Communication Networks.

== Awards and honors ==
- 2007 Received the Best Paper Award from International Conference on Wireless Algorithms, Systems and Applications (WASA'07), Chicago, Illinois, USA
- 2009-2014 Honorary Dean of Science, Xi'an Jiaotong University
- 2003 Received the Best Paper Award from the 22nd IEEE International Performance, Computing, and Communication Conference at Phoenix, Arizona, USA, April 9–11.
- 1998 Received CSTS Prize from INFORMS (a merge of American Operations Research Society and Institute of Management Science) for research excellence in the interface between Operations Research and Computer Science
- 1996 Received the 2nd Class National Natural Science Prize in China.
- 1993 Received the 1st Class Natural Science Prize from Chinese Academy of Sciences.
- 1992 Received the National Young Scientist Prize from China
- 1990-1991 The proof of Gilbert–Pollak conjecture was reported in The New York Times.
- 1989 Received the 1st Class Young Scientist Prize from Chinese Academy of Sciences, Beijing, China.
- 1988 Received the 3rd Class National Natural Science Prize in China.

== Personal life ==
Du is married to Weili Wu, also a professor of computer science at the University of Texas at Dallas. They met at the University of Minnesota, when Wu was a student there and Du was a professor.
