= Polynomial-time approximation scheme =

Type of approximation algorithm

In computer science (particularly algorithmics), a polynomial-time approximation scheme (PTAS) is a type of approximation algorithm for optimization problems (most often, NP-hard optimization problems).

A PTAS is an algorithm which takes an instance of an optimization problem and a parameter ε > 0 and produces a solution that is within a factor 1 + ε of being optimal (or 1 – ε for maximization problems). For example, for the Euclidean traveling salesman problem, a PTAS would produce a tour with length at most (1 + ε)L, with L being the length of the shortest tour.

The running time of a PTAS is required to be polynomial in the problem size for every fixed ε, but can be different for different ε. Thus an algorithm running in time O(n^{1/ε}) or even O(n^{exp(1/ε)}) counts as a PTAS.

== Variants ==
=== Deterministic ===
A practical problem with PTAS algorithms is that the exponent of the polynomial could increase dramatically as ε shrinks, for example if the runtime is O(n^{(1/ε)!}). One way of addressing this is to define the efficient polynomial-time approximation scheme or EPTAS, in which the running time is required to be O(n^{c}) for a constant c independent of ε. This ensures that an increase in problem size has the same relative effect on runtime regardless of what ε is being used; however, the constant under the big-O can still depend on ε arbitrarily. In other words, an EPTAS runs in FPT time where the parameter is ε.

Even more restrictive, and useful in practice, is the fully polynomial-time approximation scheme or FPTAS, which requires the algorithm to be polynomial in both the problem size n and 1/ε.

Unless P = NP, it holds that FPTAS ⊊ PTAS ⊊ APX. Consequently, under this assumption, APX-hard problems do not have PTASs.

Another deterministic variant of the PTAS is the quasi-polynomial-time approximation scheme or QPTAS. A QPTAS has time complexity n^{polylog(n)} for each fixed ε > 0. Furthermore, a PTAS can run in FPT time for some parameterization of the problem, which leads to a parameterized approximation scheme.

=== Randomized ===
Some problems which do not have a PTAS may admit a randomized algorithm with similar properties, a polynomial-time randomized approximation scheme or PRAS. A PRAS is an algorithm which takes an instance of an optimization or counting problem and a parameter ε > 0 and, in polynomial time, produces a solution that has a high probability of being within a factor ε of optimal. Conventionally, "high probability" means probability greater than 3/4, though as with most probabilistic complexity classes the definition is robust to variations in this exact value (the bare minimum requirement is generally greater than 1/2). Like a PTAS, a PRAS must have running time polynomial in n, but not necessarily in ε; with further restrictions on the running time in ε, one can define an efficient polynomial-time randomized approximation scheme or EPRAS similar to the EPTAS, and a fully polynomial-time randomized approximation scheme or FPRAS similar to the FPTAS.

== As a complexity class ==
The term PTAS may also be used to refer to the class of optimization problems that have a PTAS. PTAS is a subset of APX, and unless P = NP, it is a strict subset.

Membership in PTAS can be shown using a PTAS reduction, L-reduction, or P-reduction, all of which preserve PTAS membership, and these may also be used to demonstrate PTAS-completeness. On the other hand, showing non-membership in PTAS (namely, the nonexistence of a PTAS), may be done by showing that the problem is APX-hard, after which the existence of a PTAS would show P = NP. APX-hardness is commonly shown via PTAS reduction or AP-reduction.

== See also ==
- Parameterized approximation scheme, an approximation scheme that runs in FPT time
