= Yingshu Li =

Chinese-American computer scientist

Yingshu Li is a Chinese and American computer scientist, and a professor of computer science at Georgia State University in Atlanta. Her research interests include distributed computation in wireless sensor networks, and information privacy.

Li has a 2001 bachelor's degree in computer science from the Beijing Institute of Technology. She continued her studies in computer science at the University of Minnesota, where she received a master's degree in 2003 and completed her Ph.D. in 2005. Her dissertation, Energy Management in Wireless Networks, was jointly supervised by Jaideep Srivastava and Ding-Zhu Du.

She was named to the 2026 class of IEEE Fellows, "for contributions to energy conservation and topology control in wireless networks".
