= APX =

Complexity class of approximable problems

In computational complexity theory, the class APX (an abbreviation of "approximable") is the set of NP optimization problems that allow polynomial-time approximation algorithms with approximation ratio bounded by a constant (or constant-factor approximation algorithms for short). In simple terms, problems in this class have efficient algorithms that can find an answer within some fixed multiplicative factor of the optimal answer.

== Definition ==
An approximation algorithm is called an $f(n)$-approximation algorithm for input size $n$ if it can be proven that the solution that the algorithm finds is at most a multiplicative factor of $f(n)$ times worse than the optimal solution. Here, $f(n)$ is called the approximation ratio. Problems in APX are those NP optimization problems that admit a polynomial-time approximation algorithm for which $f(n)$ is a constant. The approximation ratio is conventionally stated greater than 1. In the case of minimization problems, $f(n)$ is the found solution's score divided by the optimum solution's score, while for maximization problems the reverse is the case. For maximization problems, where an inferior solution has a smaller score, $f(n)$ is sometimes stated as less than 1; in such cases, the reciprocal of $f(n)$ is the ratio of the score of the found solution to the score of the optimum solution.

A problem is said to have a polynomial-time approximation scheme (PTAS) if for every multiplicative factor of the optimum worse than 1 there is a polynomial-time algorithm to solve the problem to within that factor. Unless P = NP there exist problems that are in APX but without a PTAS, so the class of problems with a PTAS is strictly contained in APX. One example of a problem with a PTAS is the knapsack problem.

== APX-hardness and APX-completeness ==
A problem is said to be APX-hard if there is a PTAS reduction from every problem in APX to that problem, and to be APX-complete if the problem is APX-hard and also in APX. As a consequence of P ≠ NP ⇒ PTAS ≠ APX, if P ≠ NP is assumed, no APX-hard problem has a PTAS. In practice, reducing one problem to another to demonstrate APX-completeness is often done using other reduction schemes, such as L-reductions, which imply PTAS reductions.

=== Examples ===
One of the simplest APX-complete problems is MAX-3SAT, a variation of the Boolean satisfiability problem. In this problem, we have a Boolean formula in conjunctive normal form where each variable appears at most 3 times, and we wish to know the maximum number of clauses that can be simultaneously satisfied by a single assignment of true/false values to the variables.

Other APX-complete problems include:

- Max independent set in bounded-degree graphs (here, the approximation ratio depends on the maximum degree of the graph, but is constant if the max degree is fixed).
- Min vertex cover. The complement of any maximal independent set must be a vertex cover.
- Min dominating set in bounded-degree graphs.
- The travelling salesman problem when the distances in the graph satisfy the conditions of a metric. TSP is NPO-complete in the general case.
- The token reconfiguration problem, via L-reduction from set cover.

== Related complexity classes ==
=== PTAS ===
PTAS (polynomial time approximation scheme) consists of problems that can be approximated to within any constant factor besides 1 in time that is polynomial to the input size, but the polynomial depends on such factor. This class is a subset of APX.

=== APX-intermediate ===
Unless P = NP, there exist problems in APX that are neither in PTAS nor APX-complete. Such problems can be thought of as having a hardness between PTAS problems and APX-complete problems, and may be called APX-intermediate. The bin packing problem is thought to be APX-intermediate. Despite not having a known PTAS, the bin packing problem has several "asymptotic PTAS" algorithms, which behave like a PTAS when the optimum solution is large, so intuitively it may be easier than problems that are APX-hard.

One other example of a potentially APX-intermediate problem is min edge coloring.

=== f(n)-APX ===
One can also define a family of complexity classes $f(n)$-APX, where $f(n)$-APX contains problems with a polynomial time approximation algorithm with a $O(f(n))$ approximation ratio. One can analogously define $f(n)$-APX-complete classes; some such classes contain well-known optimization problems. Log-APX-completeness and poly-APX-completeness are defined in terms of AP-reductions rather than PTAS-reductions; this is because PTAS-reductions are not strong enough to preserve membership in Log-APX and Poly-APX, even though they suffice for APX.

Log-APX-complete, consisting of the hardest problems that can be approximated efficiently to within a factor logarithmic in the input size, includes min dominating set when degree is unbounded.

Poly-APX-complete, consisting of the hardest problems that can be approximated efficiently to within a factor polynomial in the input size, includes max independent set in the general case.

There also exist problems that are exp-APX-complete, where the approximation ratio is exponential in the input size. This may occur when the approximation is dependent on the value of numbers within the problem instance; these numbers may be expressed in space logarithmic in their value, hence the exponential factor.

== See also ==
- Approximation-preserving reduction
- Complexity class
- Approximation algorithm
- Max/min CSP/Ones classification theorems - a set of theorems that enable mechanical classification of problems about Boolean relations into approximability complexity classes
- MaxSNP - a closely related subclass
