= Inclusion (logic) =

In logic and mathematics, inclusion is the concept that all the contents of one object are also contained within a second object.

For example, if m and n are two logical matrices, then

$$m \subset n \quad \text{when} \quad \forall i,j \quad m_{ij} = 1 \implies n_{ij} = 1 .$$

The modern symbol for inclusion first appears in Gergonne (1816), who defines it as one idea 'containing' or being 'contained' by another, using the backward letter 'C' to express this. Peirce articulated this clearly in 1870, arguing also that inclusion was a wider concept than equality, and hence a logically simpler one. Schröder (also Frege) calls the same concept 'subordination'.
