= Alexander Zelikovsky =

American computer scientist

- Education: Byelorussian Academy of Sciences; Moldova State University
- Known for: Steiner Tree Approximation
- Awards: Society for Industrial and Applied Mathematics (SIAM) Outstanding Paper Prize
- Scientific career
- Fields: Computer Science, Computational Biology, Bioinformatics, Combinatorial Optimization, Wireless sensor networks
- Workplaces: Georgia State University

Alexander Zelikovsky is a professor of computer science at Georgia State University. He is known for an approximation algorithm for the minimum Steiner tree problem with an approximation ratio 1.55, widely cited by his peers and also widely held in libraries.
