= Weili Wu =

Chinese–American computer scientist

Weili (Lily) Wu is a Chinese and American computer scientist, the director of the Data Communication and Data Management Laboratory at the University of Texas at Dallas, where she is a professor of computer science. The topics of her research include wireless sensor networks, influence maximization and rumor spreading in social networks, and the analysis of geospatial data.

== Education and career ==
Wu was a student at Liaoning Technical University, where she received a bachelor's degree in mechanical engineering in 1989, and then became a China Coal Research Academic in the Chinese Academy of Mine Science and Technology from 1989 to 1993.

Next, she moved to the US, started her graduate studies at the University of Wisconsin, and earned a master's degree in economics there. After shifting to computer science at the University of Minnesota, she received a master's degree in 1997 and completed her Ph.D. in 2002. Her dissertation, Modeling spatial dependencies for data mining, was supervised by Shashi Shekhar.

Wu joined the University of Texas at Dallas as an assistant professor of computer science in 2002. She was promoted to associate professor in 2008 and to full professor in 2013.

== Recognition ==
Wu was named to the 2025 class of IEEE Fellows "for contributions to study of data communication and processing in wireless sensor networks".

== Personal life ==
Wu is married to Ding-Zhu Du, also a professor of computer science at the University of Texas at Dallas. They met at the University of Minnesota, when Wu was a student there and Du was a professor.
