= Domination analysis =

Domination analysis of an approximation algorithm is a way to estimate its performance, introduced by Glover and Punnen in 1997. Unlike the classical approximation ratio analysis, which compares the numerical quality of a calculated solution with that of an optimal solution, domination analysis involves examining the rank of the calculated solution in the sorted order of all possible solutions. In this style of analysis, an algorithm is said to have dominance number or domination number K, if there exists a subset of K different solutions to the problem among which the algorithm's output is the best. Domination analysis can also be expressed using a domination ratio, which is the fraction of the solution space that is no better than the given solution; this number always lies within the interval [0,1], with larger numbers indicating better solutions. Domination analysis is most commonly applied to problems for which the total number of possible solutions is known and for which exact solution is difficult.

For instance, in the Traveling salesman problem, there are (n-1)! possible solutions for a problem instance with n cities. If an algorithm can be shown to have dominance number close to (n-1)!, or equivalently to have domination ratio close to 1, then it can be taken as preferable to an algorithm with lower dominance number.

If it is possible to efficiently find random samples of a problem's solution space, as it is in the Traveling salesman problem, then it is straightforward for a randomized algorithm to find a solution that with high probability has high domination ratio: simply construct a set of samples and select the best solution from among them. (See, e.g., Orlin and Sharma.)

The dominance number described here should not be confused with the domination number of a graph, which refers to the number of vertices in the smallest dominating set of the graph.

Recently, a growing number of articles in which domination analysis has been applied to assess the performance of heuristics has appeared. This kind of analysis may be seen as competing with the classical approximation ratio analysis tradition. The two measures may also be viewed as complementary.

== Known Results ==
This section contains a technical survey of known results.

=== Vertex Cover ===
 Inapproximability. Let ε > 0. Unless P=NP, there is no polynomial algorithm for Vertex Cover
 such that its domination number is greater than 3^((n-n^ε)/3).

=== Knapsack ===
 Inapproximability. Let ε > 0. Unless P=NP, there is no polynomial algorithm for Knapsack
 such that its domination number is greater than 2^(n-n^ε).
