= Mihaela Cardei =

Romanian-American computer scientist

Mihaela Cardei is a Romanian-American computer scientist known for her research on wireless ad hoc networks. She is a professor in the Department of Computer and Electrical Engineering and Computer Science at Florida Atlantic University, where she is also associate dean for graduate studies.

== Education and career ==
Cardei earned bachelor's and master's degrees in computer science in 1995 and 1996, respectively, at the Politehnica University of Bucharest. She completed her Ph.D. in 2003 at the University of Minnesota, under the supervision of Ding-Zhu Du.

She joined Florida Atlantic University as an assistant professor in 2003, was promoted to professor in 2014, and became associate dean in 2018.

== Recognition ==
Florida Atlantic University named Cardei their researcher of the year at the assistant professor level for 2006–2007.
