= Maggie Cheng =

Applied mathematician, computer scientist, and network scientist

- Citizenship: China
- Education: Beijing University of Aeronautics and Astronautics(BSc, MSc) University of Minnesota(Ph.D. in computer science in 2003)
- Occupations: applied mathematician and computer scientist
- Employer: Illinois Institute of Technology

Maggie Xiaoyan Cheng is an applied mathematician and computer scientist who works as a professor of applied mathematics at the Illinois Institute of Technology, where she directs the Center for Interdisciplinary Scientific Computation. Her research interests include cyber security and Machine Learning.

== Education and career ==
Cheng has a bachelor's and master's degree from the Beijing University of Aeronautics and Astronautics. She completed a Ph.D. in computer science in 2003 from the University of Minnesota.

After completing her doctorate, she became an assistant professor of computer science at the Missouri University of Science and Technology. She moved to the Martin Tuchman School of Management of the New Jersey Institute of Technology in 2016, and moved to the Illinois Institute of Technology in 2018, and she was promoted to full professor in 2020.
