= Thomas Jerome Schaefer =

American mathematician

- Education: University of California, Berkeley
- Known for: Schaefer's dichotomy theorem
- Scientific career
- Fields: Computational complexity theory, Game theory
- Workplaces: University of California, Berkeley
- Thesis: The Complexity of Some Two-Person Perfect-Information Games (1978)
- Doctoral advisor: Richard M. Karp

Thomas Jerome Schaefer is an American mathematician.

He obtained his Ph.D. in December 1978 from the University of California, Berkeley, where he worked in the Department of Mathematics. His Ph.D. advisor was Richard M. Karp.

He is well-known for his dichotomy theorem, stating that any problem generalizing Boolean satisfiability in a certain way is either in the complexity class P or is NP-complete.
