= XOR-SAT =

In computational complexity, XOR-SAT (also known as XORSAT) is the class of boolean satisfiability problems where each clause contains XOR (i.e. exclusive or, written "⊕") rather than (plain) OR operators. (Note: Formally, generalized conjunctive normal forms with a ternary Boolean function R are employed, which is TRUE just if 1 or 3 of its arguments is. An input clause with more than 3 literals can be transformed into an equisatisfiable conjunction of clauses á 3 literals similar to above; i.e. XOR-SAT can be reduced to XOR-3-SAT.) XOR-SAT is in P, since an XOR-SAT formula can also be viewed as a system of linear equations mod 2, and can be solved in cubic time by Gaussian elimination;. This recast is based on the kinship between Boolean algebras and Boolean rings, and the fact that arithmetic modulo two forms the finite field GF(2).

== Examples ==
Here is an unsatisfiable XOR-SAT instance of 2 variables and 3 clauses: (Note: All the examples can be proved by the table of truth.)

(a ⊕ b) ∧ (a) ∧ (b)

Here is a satisfiable XOR-SAT instance of 2 variables and 1 clause admitting 2 solutions:

(a ⊕ b)

And here is a unique XOR-SAT instance, that is to say a satisfiable XOR-SAT instance of 2 variables and 2 clauses admitting exactly one solution:

(a ⊕ b) ∧ (a)

== Comparison with SAT variations ==
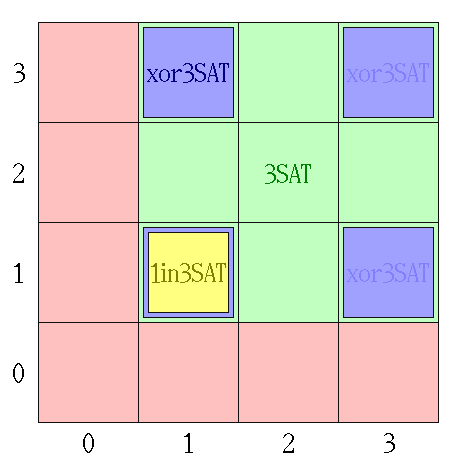
A formula with 2 clauses may be unsatisfied (red), 3-satisfied (green), xor-3-satisfied (blue), or/and 1-in-3-satisfied (yellow), depending on the TRUE-literal count in the 1st (hor) and 2nd (vert) clause.

Since a ⊕ b ⊕ c evaluates to TRUE if and only if exactly 1 or 3 members of {a,b,c} are TRUE, each solution of the 1-in-3-SAT problem for a given CNF formula is also a solution of the XOR-3-SAT problem, and in turn each solution of XOR-3-SAT is a solution of 3-SAT; see the picture. As a consequence, for each CNF formula, it is possible to solve the XOR-3-SAT problem defined by the formula, and based on the result infer either that the 3-SAT problem is solvable or that the 1-in-3-SAT problem is unsolvable.

Provided that the complexity classes P and NP are not equal, neither 2-, nor Horn-, nor XOR-satisfiability is NP-complete, unlike SAT.

== Solving an XOR-SAT example by Gaussian elimination ==
Given formula (the red clause is optional):

(x_{1} ⊕ ¬x_{2} ⊕ x_{4}) ∧ (x_{2} ⊕ x_{4} ⊕ ¬x_{3}) ∧ (x_{1} ⊕ x_{2} ⊕ ¬x_{3}) ∧ (x_{1} ⊕ x_{2} ⊕ x_{4})

=== Equation system ===
"1" means TRUE, "0" means FALSE. Each clause leads to one equation.

| x_{1} | ⊕ | ¬ | x_{2} | ⊕ | | x_{4} | = 1 |
| x_{2} | ⊕ | | x_{4} | ⊕ | ¬ | x_{3} | = 1 |
| x_{1} | ⊕ | | x_{2} | ⊕ | ¬ | x_{3} | = 1 |
| x_{1} | ⊕ | | x_{2} | ⊕ | | x_{4} | ≃ 1 |

=== Normalized equation system ===
Using properties of Boolean rings (¬x=1⊕x, x⊕x=0)

| x_{1} | ⊕ | x_{2} | ⊕ | x_{4} | = 0 |
| x_{2} | ⊕ | x_{4} | ⊕ | x_{3} | = 0 |
| x_{1} | ⊕ | x_{2} | ⊕ | x_{3} | = 0 |
| x_{1} | ⊕ | x_{2} | ⊕ | x_{4} | ≃ 1 |

If the red equation is present, it contradicts the first black one, so the system is unsolvable. Therefore, Gauss' algorithm is used only for the black equations.

=== Associated coefficient matrix ===
| x_{1} | x_{2} | x_{3} | x_{4} | | line |
|---|---|---|---|---|---|
| 1 | 1 | 0 | 1 | 0 | A |
| 0 | 1 | 1 | 1 | 0 | B |
| 1 | 1 | 1 | 0 | 0 | C |

=== Transforming to echelon form ===
| x_{1} | x_{2} | x_{3} | x_{4} | | operation |
|---|---|---|---|---|---|
| 1 | 1 | 0 | 1 | 0 | A |
| 0 | 1 | 1 | 1 | 0 | B |
| 0 | 0 | 1 | 1 | 0 | D = C ⊕ A |

=== Transforming to diagonal form ===
| x_{1} | x_{2} | x_{3} | x_{4} | | operation |
|---|---|---|---|---|---|
| 1 | 0 | 0 | 1 | 0 | F = A ⊕ B ⊕ D |
| 0 | 1 | 0 | 0 | 0 | E = B ⊕ D |
| 0 | 0 | 1 | 1 | 0 | D |

=== Variable random assignments ===
For all the variables at the right of the diagonal form (if any), we assign any random value.

| x_{1} | x_{2} | x_{3} | x_{4}=TRUE | | Result of the assigned values |
|---|---|---|---|---|---|
| x_{1} | | | TRUE | FALSE | x_{1} = TRUE |
| | x_{2} | | | FALSE | x_{2} = FALSE |
| | | x_{3} | TRUE | FALSE | x_{3} = TRUE |

=== Solution ===
If the red clause is present, the instance is unsolvable. Otherwise:

- x_{1} = 1 = TRUE
- x_{2} = 0 = FALSE
- x_{3} = 1 = TRUE
- x_{4} = 1 = TRUE

As a consequence, R(x_{1}, ¬x_{2}, x_{4}) ∧ R(x_{2}, x_{4}, ¬x_{3}) ∧ R(x_{1}, x_{2}, ¬x_{3}) ∧ R(¬x_{1},x_{2},x_{4}) is not 1-in-3-satisfiable, while (x_{1} ∨ ¬x_{2} ∨ x_{4}) ∧ (x_{2} ∨ x_{4} ∨ ¬x_{3}) ∧ (x_{1} ∨ x_{2} ∨ ¬x_{3}) ∧ (x_{1} ∨ x_{2} ∨ x_{4}) is 3-satisfiable with x_{1}=x_{2}=x_{3}=x_{4}=TRUE.
