= Farthest-first traversal =

Sequence of points far from previous points

The first five points in a farthest-first traversal of a planar point set. The first point is chosen arbitrarily and each successive point is as far as possible from all previously chosen points.

In computational geometry, the farthest-first traversal of a compact metric space is a sequence of points in the space, where the first point is selected arbitrarily and each successive point is as far as possible from the set of previously-selected points. The same concept can also be applied to a finite set of geometric points, by restricting the selected points to belong to the set or equivalently by considering the finite metric space generated by these points. For a finite metric space or finite set of geometric points, the resulting sequence forms a permutation of the points, also known as the greedy permutation.

Every prefix of a farthest-first traversal provides a set of points that is widely spaced and close to all remaining points. More precisely, no other set of equally many points can be spaced more than twice as widely, and no other set of equally many points can be less than half as far to its farthest remaining point. In part because of these properties, farthest-point traversals have many applications, including the approximation of the traveling salesman problem and the metric k-center problem. They may be constructed in polynomial time, or (for low-dimensional Euclidean spaces) approximated in near-linear time.

== Definition and properties ==
A farthest-first traversal is a sequence of points in a compact metric space, with each point appearing at most once. If the space is finite, each point appears exactly once, and the traversal is a permutation of all of the points in the space. The first point of the sequence may be any point in the space. Each point p after the first must have the maximum possible distance to the set of points earlier than p in the sequence, where the distance from a point to a set is defined as the minimum of the pairwise distances to points in the set. A given space may have many different farthest-first traversals, depending both on the choice of the first point in the sequence (which may be any point in the space) and on ties for the maximum distance among later choices.

Farthest-point traversals may be characterized by the following properties. Fix a number k, and consider the prefix formed by the first k points of the farthest-first traversal of any metric space. Let r be the distance between the final point of the prefix and the other points in the prefix. Then this subset has the following two properties:

- All pairs of the selected points are at distance at least r from each other, and
- All points of the metric space are at distance at most r from the subset.

Conversely any sequence having these properties, for all choices of k, must be a farthest-first traversal. These are the two defining properties of a Delone set, so each prefix of the farthest-first traversal forms a Delone set.

== Applications ==
Rosenkrantz, Stearns & Lewis (1977) used the farthest-first traversal to define the farthest-insertion heuristic for the travelling salesman problem. This heuristic finds approximate solutions to the travelling salesman problem by building up a tour on a subset of points, adding one point at a time to the tour in the ordering given by a farthest-first traversal. To add each point to the tour, one edge of the previous tour is broken and replaced by a pair of edges through the added point, in the cheapest possible way. Although Rosenkrantz et al. prove only a logarithmic approximation ratio for this method, they show that in practice it often works better than other insertion methods with better provable approximation ratios.

Later, the same sequence of points was popularized by Gonzalez (1985), who used it as part of greedy approximation algorithms for two problems in clustering, in which the goal is to partition a set of points into k clusters. One of the two problems that Gonzalez solve in this way seeks to minimize the maximum diameter of a cluster, while the other, known as the metric k-center problem, seeks to minimize the maximum radius, the distance from a chosen central point of a cluster to the farthest point from it in the same cluster. For instance, the k-center problem can be used to model the placement of fire stations within a city, in order to ensure that every address within the city can be reached quickly by a fire truck. For both clustering problems, Gonzalez chooses a set of k cluster centers by selecting the first k points of a farthest-first traversal, and then creates clusters by assigning each input point to the nearest cluster center. If r is the distance from the set of k selected centers to the next point at position k + 1 in the traversal, then with this clustering every point is within distance r of its center and every cluster has diameter at most 2r. However, the subset of k centers together with the next point are all at distance at least r from each other, and any k-clustering would put some two of these points into a single cluster, with one of them at distance at least r/2 from its center and with diameter at least r. Thus, Gonzalez's heuristic gives an approximation ratio of 2 for both clustering problems.

Gonzalez's heuristic was independently rediscovered for the metric k-center problem by Dyer & Frieze (1985), who applied it more generally to weighted k-center problems. Another paper on the k-center problem from the same time, Hochbaum & Shmoys (1985), achieves the same approximation ratio of 2, but its techniques are different. Nevertheless, Gonzalez's heuristic, and the name "farthest-first traversal", are often incorrectly attributed to Hochbaum and Shmoys. For both the min-max diameter clustering problem and the metric k-center problem, these approximations are optimal: the existence of a polynomial-time heuristic with any constant approximation ratio less than 2 would imply that P = NP.

As well as for clustering, the farthest-first traversal can also be used in another type of facility location problem, the max-min facility dispersion problem, in which the goal is to choose the locations of k different facilities so that they are as far apart from each other as possible. More precisely, the goal in this problem is to choose k points from a given metric space or a given set of candidate points, in such a way as to maximize the minimum pairwise distance between the selected points. Again, this can be approximated by choosing the first k points of a farthest-first traversal. If r denotes the distance of the kth point from all previous points, then every point of the metric space or the candidate set is within distance r of the first k − 1 points. By the pigeonhole principle, some two points of the optimal solution (whatever it is) must both be within distance r of the same point among these first k − 1 chosen points, and (by the triangle inequality) within distance 2r of each other. Therefore, the heuristic solution given by the farthest-first traversal is within a factor of two of optimal.

Other applications of the farthest-first traversal include color quantization (clustering the colors in an image to a smaller set of representative colors), progressive scanning of images (choosing an order to display the pixels of an image so that prefixes of the ordering produce good lower-resolution versions of the whole image rather than filling in the image from top to bottom), point selection in the probabilistic roadmap method for motion planning, simplification of point clouds, generating masks for halftone images, hierarchical clustering, finding the similarities between polygon meshes of similar surfaces, choosing diverse and high-value observation targets for underwater robot exploration, fault detection in sensor networks, modeling phylogenetic diversity, matching vehicles in a heterogenous fleet to customer delivery requests, uniform distribution of geodetic observatories on the Earth's surface or of other types of sensor network, generation of virtual point lights in the instant radiosity computer graphics rendering method, and geometric range searching data structures.

== Algorithms ==
=== Greedy exact algorithm ===
The farthest-first traversal of a finite point set may be computed by a greedy algorithm that maintains the distance of each point from the previously selected points, performing the following steps:

- Initialize the sequence of selected points to the empty sequence, and the distances of each point to the selected points to infinity.
- While not all points have been selected, repeat the following steps:
  - Scan the list of not-yet-selected points to find a point p that has the maximum distance from the selected points.
  - Remove p from the not-yet-selected points and add it to the end of the sequence of selected points.
  - For each remaining not-yet-selected point q, replace the distance stored for q by the minimum of its old value and the distance from p to q.

For a set of n points, this algorithm takes O(n^{2}) steps and O(n^{2}) distance computations.

=== Approximations ===
A faster approximation algorithm, given by Har-Peled & Mendel (2006), applies to any subset of points in a metric space with bounded doubling dimension, a class of spaces that include the Euclidean spaces of bounded dimension. Their algorithm finds a sequence of points in which each successive point has distance within a 1 − ε factor of the farthest distance from the previously-selected point, where ε can be chosen to be any positive number. It takes time $O(n\log n)$.

The results for bounded doubling dimension do not apply to high-dimensional Euclidean spaces, because the constant factor in the big O notation for these algorithms depends on the dimension. Instead, a different approximation method based on the Johnson–Lindenstrauss lemma and locality-sensitive hashing has running time $O(\varepsilon^{-2} n^{1+1/(1+\varepsilon)^2+o(1)}).$ For metrics defined by shortest paths on weighted undirected graphs, a randomized incremental construction based on Dijkstra's algorithm achieves time $O(\varepsilon^{-1} m\log n\log\tfrac{n}{\varepsilon})$, where n and m are the numbers of vertices and edges of the input graph, respectively.

=== Incremental Voronoi insertion ===
For selecting points from a continuous space such as the Euclidean plane, rather than from a finite set of candidate points, these methods will not work directly, because there would be an infinite number of distances to maintain. Instead, each new point should be selected as the center of the largest empty circle defined by the previously-selected point set. This center will always lie on a vertex of the Voronoi diagram of the already selected points, or at a point where an edge of the Voronoi diagram crosses the domain boundary. In this formulation the method for constructing farthest-first traversals has also been called incremental Voronoi insertion. It is similar to Delaunay refinement for finite element mesh generation, but differs in the choice of which Voronoi vertex to insert at each step.

== See also ==
- Lloyd's algorithm, a different method for generating evenly spaced points in geometric spaces
