= Highway dimension =

The highway dimension is a graph parameter modelling transportation networks, such as road networks or public transportation networks. It was first formally defined by Abraham et al. based on the observation by Bast et al. that any road network has a sparse set of "transit nodes", such that driving from a point A to a sufficiently far away point B along the shortest route will always pass through one of these transit nodes. It has also been proposed that the highway dimension captures the properties of public transportation networks well, given that longer routes using busses, trains, or airplanes will typically be serviced by larger transit hubs (stations and airports). This relates to the spoke–hub distribution paradigm in transport topology optimization.

== Definitions ==
Several definitions of the highway dimension exist, although the one based on approximate shortest paths given below is the most general one. Each definition of the highway dimension uses a hitting set of a certain set of (approximate) shortest paths: given a graph $G=(V,E)$ with edge lengths $\ell:E\to\mathbb{R}^+$, let $\mathcal{P}$ contain every vertex set $P\subseteq V$ such that $P$ induces a shortest path between some vertex pair of $G$, according to the edge lengths $\ell$. To measure the highway dimension we determine the "sparseness" of a hitting set of a subset of $\mathcal{P}$ in a local area of the graph, for which we define a ball of radius $r>0$ around a vertex $u\in V$ to be the set $B_r(u)\subseteq V$ of vertices at distance at most $r$ from $u$ in $G$ according to the edge lengths $\ell$. In the context of low highway dimension graphs, the vertices of a hitting set for the shortest paths are called hubs.

=== Definition 1 ===
The original definition of the highway dimension measures the sparseness of a hub set $H$ of shortest paths contained within a ball of radius $4r$:

The highway dimension of $G$ is the smallest integer $h_1$ such that for any radius $r>0$ and any node $u\in V$ there is a hitting set $H\subseteq B_{4r}(u)$ of size at most $h_1$ for all shortest paths $P\in\mathcal{P}$ of length more than $r$ for which $P\subseteq B_{4r}(u)$.

A variant of this definition uses balls of radius $cr$ for some constant $c>4$. Choosing a constant greater than 4 implies additional structural properties of graphs of bounded highway dimension, which can be exploited algorithmically.

=== Definition 2 ===
A subsequent definition of the highway dimension measures the sparseness of a hub set $H$ of shortest paths intersecting a ball of radius $2r$:

The highway dimension of $G$ is the smallest integer $h_2$ such that for any radius $r>0$ and any node $u\in V$ there is a hitting set $H\subseteq V$ of size at most $h_2$ for all shortest paths $P\in\mathcal{P}$ of length more than $r$ and at most $2r$ for which $P\cap B_{2r}(u)\neq\emptyset$.

This definition is weaker than the first, i.e., every graph of highway dimension $h_1$ also has highway dimension $h_2$, but not vice versa.

=== Definition 3 ===
For the third definition of the highway dimension we introduce the notion of a "witness path": for a given radius $r$, a shortest path $P\in\mathcal{P}$ has an $r$-witness path $Q\in\mathcal{P}$ if $Q$ has length more than $r$ and $Q$ can be obtained from $P$ by adding at most one vertex to either end of $P$ (i.e., $Q$ has at most 2 vertices more than $P$ and these additional vertices are incident to $P$). Note that $P$ may be shorter than $r$ but is contained in $Q$, which has length more than $r$.

The highway dimension of $G$ is the smallest integer $h_3$ such that for any radius $r>0$ and any node $u\in V$ there is a hitting set $H\subseteq V$ of size at most $h_3$ for all shortest paths $P\in\mathcal{P}$ that have an $r$-witness path $Q$ with $Q\cap B_{2r}(u)\neq\emptyset$.

This definition is stronger than the above, i.e., every graph of highway dimension $h_1$ also has highway dimension $h_3=O(h_1^2)$, but $h_1$ cannot be bounded in terms of $h_3$.

=== Definition based on approximate shortest paths ===
A more recent development has introduced a relaxed definition of highway dimension that considers approximate shortest paths. In this case the highway dimension is not a value but a function, that for any $\varepsilon$ gives the sparseness of the hub sets. Here, $\varepsilon$ determines how close to the actual shortest paths we want to be.

A weighted graph $G$ has highway dimension $h:\mathbb{R}_{\geq 0}\to\mathbb{N}\cup\{\infty\}$ if for every $\varepsilon\geq 0$ and $v\in V$, there exists a subset $H_\varepsilon\subseteq V$ with $|H_\varepsilon|\leq h(\varepsilon)$ vertices, such that the following property of the ball $B=B_{(4+8\varepsilon)r}(v)$ holds. For every pair of vertices $u,z \in B$ of distance more than $r$, there is a $u-z$ path $P$ of length at most $(1+\varepsilon)$ the distance from $u$ to $z$, such that $P$ intersects $H_\varepsilon$.

This relaxation generalises the original definition, and even includes all doubling spaces.

=== Shortest path cover ===
A notion closely related to the highway dimension is that of a shortest path cover, where the order of the quantifiers in the definition is reversed, i.e., instead of a hub set for each ball, there is a one hub set $H$, which is sparse in every ball:

Given a radius $r>0$, an $r$-shortest path cover of $G$ is a hitting set $H\subseteq V$ for all shortest paths in $\mathcal{P}$ of length more than $r$ and at most $2r$. The $r$-shortest path cover $H$ is locally $h$-sparse if any node $u\in V$ the ball $B_{2r}(u)$ contains at most $h$ vertices of $H$, i.e., $|B_{2r}(u)\cap H|\leq h$.

Every graph of bounded highway dimension $h$ (according to any of the above definitions) also has a locally $h$-sparse $r$-shortest path cover for every $r>0$, but not vice versa. For algorithmic purposes it is often more convenient to work with one hitting set for each radius $r$, which makes shortest path covers an important tool for algorithms on graphs of bounded highway dimension. Even the relaxed definition of the highway dimension using approximate shortest paths can be shown to admit sparse shortest path covers.

== Relation to other graph parameters ==
The highway dimension combines structural and metric properties of graphs, and is thus incomparable to common structural and metric parameters. In particular, for any graph it is possible to choose edge lengths such that the highway dimension is $1$, while at the same time some graphs with very simple structure such as trees can have arbitrarily large highway dimension. This implies that the highway dimension parameter is incomparable to structural graph parameters such as treewidth, cliquewidth, or minor-freeness. On the other hand, a star with unit edge lengths has highway dimension $1$ (according to definitions 1 and 2 above) but unbounded doubling dimension, while a $k\times k$ grid graph with unit edge lengths has constant doubling dimension but highway dimension $\Omega(k)$. This means that the highway dimension according to definitions 1 and 2 is also incomparable to the doubling dimension. Any graph of bounded highway dimension according to definition 3 above, also has bounded doubling dimension. In contrast, the highway dimension defined using approximate shortest paths generalises doubling dimension, i.e., any metric of bounded doubling dimension also has bounded highway dimension according to this definition.

== Computing the highway dimension ==
Computing the highway dimension of a given graph is NP-hard. Assuming that all shortest paths are unique (which can be done by slightly perturbing the edge lengths), an $O(\log h)$-approximation can be computed in polynomial time, given that the highway dimension of the graph is $h$. It is not known whether computing the highway dimension is fixed-parameter tractable (FPT), however there are hardness results indicating that this is likely not the case. In particular, these results imply that, under standard complexity assumptions, an FPT algorithm can neither compute the highway dimension bottom-up (from the smallest value $r$ to the largest) nor top-down (from the largest value $r$ to the smallest).

== Algorithms exploiting the highway dimension ==
=== Shortest path algorithms ===
Some heuristics to compute shortest paths, such as the Reach, Contraction Hierarchies, Transit Nodes, and Hub Labelling algorithms, can be formally proven to run faster than other shortest path algorithms (e.g. Dijkstra's algorithm) on graphs of bounded highway dimension according to definition 3 above.

=== Approximations for NP-hard problems ===
A crucial property that can be exploited algorithmically for graphs of bounded highway dimension is that vertices that are far from the hubs of a shortest path cover are clustered into so-called towns:

Given a radius $r>0$, an $r$-shortest path cover $H$ of $G$, and a vertex $u\in V$ at distance more than $2r$ from $H$, the set $T\subseteq V$ of vertices at distance at most $r$ from $u$ according to the edge lengths $\ell$ is called a town. The set of all vertices not lying in any town is called the sprawl.

It can be shown that the diameter of every town is at most $r$, while the distance between a town and any vertex outside it is more than $r$. Furthermore, the distance from any vertex in the sprawl to some hub of $H$ is at most $2r$.

Based on this structure, Feldmann et al. defined the towns decomposition, which recursively decomposes the sprawl into towns of exponentially growing values $r$. For a graph of bounded highway dimension (according to definition 1 above) this decomposition can be used to find a metric embedding into a graph of bounded treewidth that preserves distances between vertices arbitrarily well. Due to this embedding it is possible to obtain quasi-polynomial time approximation schemes (QPTASs) for various problems such as Travelling Salesman (TSP), Steiner Tree, k-Median, and Facility Location.

For clustering problems such as k-Median, k-Means, and Facility Location, faster polynomial-time approximation schemes (PTASs) are known for graphs of bounded highway dimension according to definition 1 above. For network design problems such as TSP and Steiner Tree it is not known how to obtain a PTAS.

For the k-Center problem, it is not known whether a PTAS exists for graphs of bounded highway dimension, however it is NP-hard to compute a ($2-\varepsilon$)-approximation on graphs of highway dimension $O(\log^2{n})$, which implies that any ($2-\varepsilon$)-approximation algorithm needs at least double exponential time in the highway dimension, unless P=NP. On the other hand, it was shown that a parameterized $3/2$-approximation algorithm with a runtime of $2^{O(kh \log{h} )}n^{O(1)}$ exists for k-Center where $h$ is the highway dimension according to any of the above definitions. When using definition 1 above, a parameterized approximation scheme (PAS) is known to exist when using $k$ and $h$ as parameters.

For the Capacitated k-Center problem there is no PAS parameterized by $k$ and the highway dimension $h$, unless FPT=W[1]. This is notable, since typically (i.e., for all the problems mentioned above), if there is an approximation scheme for metrics of low doubling dimension, then there is also one for graphs of bounded highway dimension. But for Capacitated k-Center there is a PAS parameterized by $k$ and the doubling dimension.

In a recent paper, it was shown that towns and sprawl can also be found in graphs of bounded highway dimension when defined using approximate shortest paths. This paper also shows that the Travelling Salesman problem (TSP) admits a PAS parameterized by the highway dimension. Furthermore, it is possible to construct padded decompositions, sparse covers/partitions, and tree covers. An abundance of applications follow based on known results.
