= Spoke–hub distribution paradigm =

Form of transport routing

The spoke–hub distribution paradigm (also known as the hub-and-spoke system) is a form of transport topology optimization in which traffic planners organize routes as a series of spokes that connect outlying points to a central "hub". Simple forms of this distribution/connection model contrast with point-to-point transit systems, in which each point has a direct route to every other point, and which modeled the principal method of transporting passengers and freight until the 1970s. Delta Air Lines pioneered the spoke–hub distribution model in 1955. In the late 1970s the telecommunications and information technology sector subsequently adopted this distribution topology, dubbing it the star network network topology.

"Hubbing" involves "the arrangement of a transportation network as a hub-and-spoke model".

Point-to-point (top) vs hub-and-spoke (bottom) networks

== Commercial aviation ==
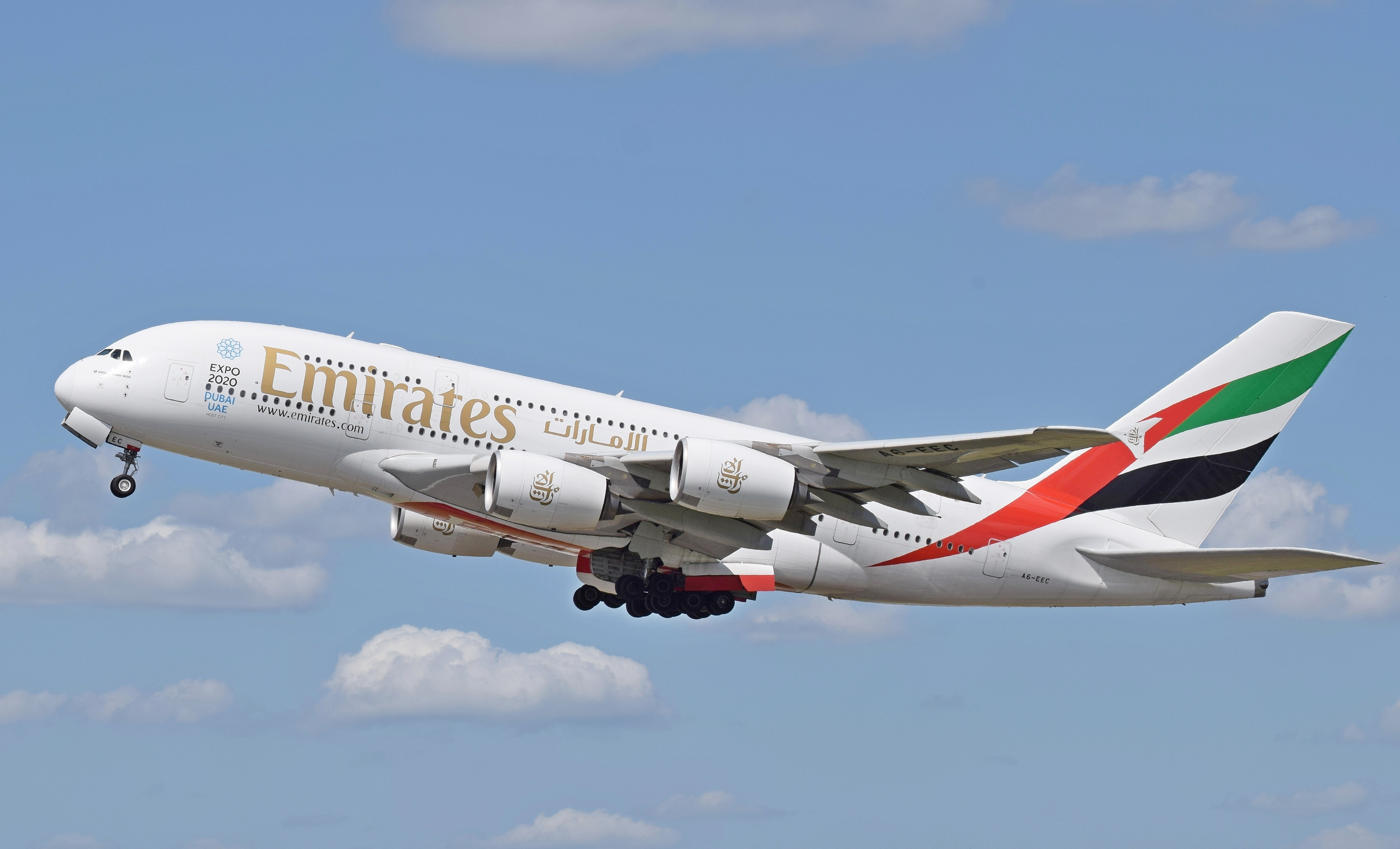
Emirates is an example of an airline which operates using the hub-and-spoke model, allowing flights between numerous spoke destinations by connecting at the airline's hub at Dubai.

In 1955, Delta Air Lines pioneered the hub-and-spoke system at its hub in Atlanta, Georgia, in an effort to compete with Eastern Air Lines. In the mid-1970s FedEx adopted the hub-and-spoke model for overnight package delivery. After the airline industry was deregulated in 1978, several other airlines adopted Delta's hub-and-spoke paradigm.

Airlines have extended the hub-and-spoke model in various ways. One method is to create additional hubs on a regional basis and to create major routes between them. That reduces the need to travel long distances between nodes near one another. Another method is to use focus cities to implement point-to-point service for high-traffic routes and to bypass the hub entirely.

== Transportation ==
The spoke–hub model is applicable to other forms of transportation as well:

- Sea transport in which feeder ships transport shipping containers from different ports to a central container terminal to be loaded onto larger vessels.
- Cargo airlines: most UPS Airlines flights travel through its Worldport at Louisville International Airport, and many FedEx Express parcels are processed at its "SuperHub" at Memphis International Airport.
- Freight rail transport in which cargo is hauled to a central exchange terminal. At the terminal, shipping containers are loaded from one freight car to another, and classification yards (marshalling yards) are used to sort freight cars into trains and divide them according to varying destinations. Intermodal freight is often loaded from one mode to another at central hubs.
- Public transit uses various transport hubs to allow passengers to transfer between different lines or transportation modes. Often those hubs are intermodal linking buses, trams, local trains, subways and so on.

For passenger road transport, the spoke–hub model does not apply because drivers generally take the shortest or fastest route between two points. However, the road network as a whole likewise contains higher order roads like limited access highways and more local roads with most trips starting and ending at the latter but spending most of the distance on the former.

== Industrial distribution ==
The hub-and-spoke model has also been used in economic geography theory to classify a particular type of industrial district. Economic geographer Ann Markusen theorized about industrial districts, with a number of key industrial firms and facilities acting as a hub, with associated businesses and suppliers benefiting from their presence and arranged around them like the spokes of a wheel. The chief characteristic of such hub-and-spoke industrial districts is the importance of one or more large companies, usually in one industrial sector, surrounded by smaller, associated businesses. Examples of cities with such districts include Seattle (where Boeing was founded), Silicon Valley (a high tech hub), and Toyota City, with Toyota.

== East Asian relations ==
In the context of East Asian geopolitics, Victor Cha says the hub-and-spokes paradigm refers to the network of alliances the United States has built individually with other East Asian countries. The 1951 Security Treaty Between the United States and Japan, the 1953 U.S.–South Korea Status of Forces Agreement and the 1954 Mutual Defense Treaty between the United States and the Republic of China (later replaced by the Taiwan Relations Act) are some examples of such bilateral security relationships. The system creates a bilateral security architecture in East Asia that is different from the multilateral security architecture in Europe. The US acts as a "hub", and Asian countries like South Korea and Japan are its spokes. There is a strong connection between the hub and the spoke, but weak or no connections between the spokes themselves.

In April 2014, all ten ASEAN defense chiefs and United States Secretary of Defense Chuck Hagel attended the US–ASEAN Defense Forum in Hawaii. The meeting was the first time the US hosted the forum and was part of a US attempt to get the countries to strengthen military ties among themselves.

== See also ==
- Foreign policy of the United States, for an example of international coordination through a third country
- Highway dimension
- Hub and spokes architecture, in computer networking
- Roundabout (traffic circle)
- Ville Radieuse
