= Minimum k-cut =

Combinatorial optimization graph problem

Minimum k-cut for k $=2$ and $3$ respectively (cuts highlighted red)

In mathematics, the minimum k-cut is a combinatorial optimization problem that requires finding a set of edges whose removal would partition the graph to at least k connected components. These edges are referred to as k-cut. The goal is to find the minimum-weight k-cut. This partitioning can have applications in VLSI design, data-mining, finite elements and communication in parallel computing.

== Formal definition ==
Given an undirected graph G = (V, E) with an assignment of weights to the edges w: E → N and an integer $k \in \{2,3, \ldots, |V|\},$ partition V into k disjoint sets $F = \{ C_1,C_2,\ldots,C_k \}$ while minimizing

$$\sum_{i=1}^{k-1} \ \sum_{j=i+1}^k \sum_{\begin{smallmatrix} v_1 \in C_i \\ v_2 \in C_j \end{smallmatrix}} w ( \left \{ v_1, v_2 \right \} ).$$

For a fixed k, the problem is polynomial time solvable in $O \bigl(|V|^{k^2} \bigr).$ However, the problem is NP-complete if k is part of the input. It is also NP-complete if we specify k vertices and ask for the minimum k-cut which separates these vertices among each of the sets.

== Approximations ==
Several approximation algorithms exist with an approximation of $2-\tfrac 2 k.$ A simple greedy algorithm that achieves this approximation factor computes a minimum cut in each of the connected components and removes the lightest one. This algorithm requires a total of n − 1 max flow computations. Another algorithm achieving the same guarantee uses the Gomory–Hu tree representation of minimum cuts. Constructing the Gomory–Hu tree requires n − 1 max flow computations, but the algorithm requires an overall O(kn) max flow computations. Yet, it is easier to analyze the approximation factor of the second algorithm. Moreover, under the small set expansion hypothesis (a conjecture closely related to the unique games conjecture), the problem is NP-hard to approximate to within (2 − ε) factor for every constant ε > 0, meaning that the aforementioned approximation algorithms are essentially tight for large k.

A variant of the problem asks for a minimum weight k-cut where the output partitions have pre-specified sizes. This problem variant is approximable to within a factor of 3 for any fixed k if one restricts the graph to a metric space, meaning a complete graph that satisfies the triangle inequality. More recently, polynomial time approximation schemes (PTAS) were discovered for those problems.

While the minimum k-cut problem is W[1]-hard parameterized by k, a parameterized approximation scheme can be obtained for this parameter.

== See also ==
- Maximum cut
- Minimum cut
