= Doubling space =

Metric space with double measurement

In the Euclidean plane, seven disks of radius r/2 can cover any disk of radius r, so the plane is a doubling space with doubling constant 7 and doubling dimension log_{2} 7.

In mathematics, a metric space X with metric d is said to be doubling if there is some doubling constant M > 0 such that for any x ∈ X and r > 0, it is possible to cover the ball B(x, r) = {y | d(x, y) < r} with the union of at most M balls of radius r/2. The base-2 logarithm of M is called the doubling dimension of X. Euclidean spaces $\mathbb{R}^d$ equipped with the usual Euclidean metric are examples of doubling spaces where the doubling constant M depends on the dimension d. For example, in one dimension, M = 3; and in two dimensions, M = 7. In general, Euclidean space $\mathbb{R}^d$ has doubling dimension $\Theta(d)$.

== Assouad's embedding theorem ==
An important question in metric space geometry is to characterize those metric spaces that can be embedded in some Euclidean space by a bi-Lipschitz function. This means that one can essentially think of the metric space as a subset of Euclidean space. Not all metric spaces may be embedded in Euclidean space. Doubling metric spaces, on the other hand, would seem like they have more of a chance, since the doubling condition says, in a way, that the metric space is not infinite dimensional. However, this is still not the case in general. The Heisenberg group with its Carnot-Carathéodory metric is an example of a doubling metric space which cannot be embedded in any Euclidean space.

Assouad's Theorem states that, for a M-doubling metric space X, if we give it the metric d(x, y)^{ε} for some 0 < ε < 1, then there is a L-bi-Lipschitz map $f:X \rarr \mathbb{R}^d$, where d and L depend on M and ε.

== Doubling Measures ==
=== Definition ===
A nontrivial measure on a metric space X is said to be doubling if the measure of any ball is finite and approximately the measure of its double, or more precisely, if there is a constant C > 0 such that

$$0<\mu(B(x,2r))\leq C\mu(B(x,r))<\infty \,$$

for all x in X and r > 0. In this case, we say μ is C-doubling. In fact, it can be proved that, necessarily, C $\geq$ 2.

A metric measure space that supports a doubling measure is necessarily a doubling metric space, where the doubling constant depends on the constant C. Conversely, every complete doubling metric space supports a doubling measure.

=== Examples ===
A simple example of a doubling measure is Lebesgue measure on a Euclidean space. One can, however, have doubling measures on Euclidean space that are singular with respect to Lebesgue measure. One example on the real line is the weak limit of the following sequence of measures:

$$d\mu_n = \prod_{i=1}^n (1+a\cos (3^i 2\pi x))\,dx,\;\;\; |a|<1.$$

One can construct another singular doubling measure μ on the interval [0, 1] as follows: for each k ≥ 0, partition the unit interval [0,1] into 3^{k} intervals of length 3^{−k}. Let Δ be the collection of all such intervals in [0,1] obtained for each k (these are the triadic intervals), and for each such interval I, let m(I) denote its "middle third" interval. Fix 0 < δ < 1 and let μ be the measure such that μ([0, 1]) = 1 and for each triadic interval I, μ(m(I)) = δμ(I). Then this gives a doubling measure on [0, 1] singular to Lebesgue measure.

== Applications ==
The definition of a doubling measure may seem arbitrary, or purely of geometric interest. However, many results from classical harmonic analysis and computational geometry extend to the setting of metric spaces with doubling measures.

== See also ==
- Highway dimension: this metric parameter generalises the doubling dimension.
