= Ambit =

Ambit or AMBIT may refer to:

- Ambit (magazine), a literary magazine
- AMBIT, a family of pattern matching programming languages
- AMBIT (Adolescent Mentalization-Based Integrative Treatment), a form of therapy
- Ubee Interactive (formerly Ambit Broadband), a producer of cable modem, ADSL, and IPTV products
- Ambit claim, an extravagant initial demand made in expectation of an eventual counter-offer and compromise
- Ambit Energy, a U.S. electricity and natural gas provider
