= Massachusetts Computer Associates =

Programming language software company

Massachusetts Computer Associates (originally just Computer Associates), also known as COMPASS, was a software company founded by Thomas Edward Cheatham Jr. and based in Wakefield, Massachusetts from approximately 1961 to 1991, focusing primarily on programming language design and implementation, especially source-to-source transformation. It was acquired in the late 1960s by Applied Data Research.

Many well-known computer scientists were employed by, or consulted for, COMPASS at some point in their careers, including Michael J. Fischer, Stephen Warshall, Robert W. Floyd, and Leslie Lamport. Some of the systems they worked on include AMBIT/G and IVTRAN, a Fortran compiler for the ILLIAC IV.

Leslie Lamport wrote his influential "Time, Clocks" paper while he was at COMPASS.

The original vectorizing compiler for the ILLIAC IV was written at COMPASS with contributions by Lamport, who worked there part-time.

Robert Floyd's Treesort algorithm was published while Floyd was at COMPASS.

== Corporate history ==
Applied Data Research (ADR) bought Massachusetts Computer Associates in the late 1960s. ADR was sold to Ameritech in 1986 and then by Ameritech to the (unrelated) Computer Associates of New York. Shortly after ADR was sold to Computer Associates, Compass was in turn sold to SofTech.
