= Distance oracle =

In computing, a distance oracle (DO) is a data structure for calculating distances between vertices in a graph.

== Introduction ==
Let G(V,E) be an undirected, weighted graph, with n = |V| nodes and m = |E| edges. We would like to answer queries of the form "what is the distance between the nodes s and t?".

One way to do this is just run the Dijkstra algorithm. This takes time $O(m + n \log n)$, and requires no extra space (besides the graph itself).

In order to answer many queries more efficiently, we can spend some time in pre-processing the graph and creating an auxiliary data structure.

A simple data structure that achieves this goal is a matrix which specifies, for each pair of nodes, the distance between them. This structure allows us to answer queries in constant time $O(1)$, but requires $O(n^2)$ extra space. It can be initialized in time $O(n^3)$ using an all-pairs shortest paths algorithm, such as the Floyd–Warshall algorithm.

A DO lies between these two extremes. It uses less than $O(n^2)$ space in order to answer queries in less than $O(m + n \log n)$ time. Most DOs have to compromise on accuracy, i.e. they don't return the accurate distance but rather a constant-factor approximation of it.

== Approximate DO ==
Thorup and Zwick describe more than 10 different DOs. They then suggest a new DO that, for every k, requires space $O(k n^{1+1/k})$, such that any subsequent distance query can be approximately answered in time $O(k)$. The approximate distance returned is of stretch at most $2k-1$, that is, the quotient obtained by dividing the estimated distance by the actual distance lies between 1 and $2k-1$. The initialization time is $O(kmn^{1/k})$.

Some special cases include:

- For $k=1$ we get the simple distance matrix.
- For $k=2$ we get a structure using $O(n^{1.5})$ space which answers each query in constant time and approximation factor at most 3.
- For $k=\lfloor \log n \rfloor$, we get a structure using $O(n \log n)$ space, query time $O(\log n)$, and stretch $O(\log n)$.

Higher values of k do not improve the space or preprocessing time.

=== DO for general metric spaces ===
The oracle is built of a decreasing collection of k+1 sets of vertices:

- $A_0 = V$
- For every $i=1,\ldots,k-1$: $A_i$ contains each element of $A_{i-1}$, independently, with probability $n^{-1/k}$. Note that the expected size of $A_i$ is $n^{1-i/k}$. The elements of $A_i$ are called i-centers.
- $A_k = \emptyset$

For every node v, calculate its distance from each of these sets:

- For every $i=0,\ldots,k-1$: $d(A_i,v) = \min{(d(w,v)|w\in A_i}$ and $p_i(v) = \arg \min{(d(w,v)|w\in A_i}$. I.e., $p_i(v)$ is the i-center nearest to v, and $d(A_i,v)$ is the distance between them. Note that for a fixed v, this distance is weakly increasing with i. Also note that for every v, $d(A_0,v)=0$ and $p_0(v)=v$.
- $d(A_k,v)=\infty$.

For every node v, calculate:

- For every $i=0,\ldots,k-1$: $B_i(v) = \{w\in A_i\setminus A_{i+1}|d(w,v)<d(A_{i+1},v)\}$. $B_i(v)$ contains all vertices in $A_i$ which are strictly closer to v than all vertices in $A_{i+1}$. The partial unions of $B_i$s are balls in increasing diameter, that contain vertices with distances up to the first vertex of the next level.

For every v, compute its bunch:

- $B(v) = \bigcup_{i=0}^{k-1}B_i(v).$

It is possible to show that the expected size of $B(v)$ is at most $kn^{1/k}$.

For every bunch $B(v)$, construct a hash table that holds, for every $w\in B(V)$, the distance $d(w,v)$.

The total size of the data structure is $O(kn+\Sigma|B(v)|)=O(kn+nkn^{1/k})=O(kn^{1+1/k})$

Having this structure initialized, the following algorithm finds the distance between two nodes, u and v:

- $w:=u, i:=0$
- while $w\notin B(v)$:
  - $i:=i+1$
  - $(u,v):=(v,u)$ (swap the two input nodes; this does not change the distance between them since the graph is undirected).
  - $w := p_i(u)$
- return $d(w,u)+d(w,v)$

It is possible to show that, in each iteration, the distance $d(w,u)$ grows by at most $d(v,u)$. Since $A_{k-1}\subseteq B(v)$, there are at most k-1 iterations, so finally $d(w,u)\leq (k-1)d(v,u)$. Now by the triangle inequality, $d(w,v)\leq d(w,u)+d(u,v)\leq kd(v,u)$, so the distance returned is at most $(2k-1)d(u,v)$.

=== Improvements ===
The above result was later improved by Patrascu and Roditty who suggest a DO of size $O(n^{4/3} m^{1/3})$ which returns a factor 2 approximation.

== Reduction from set intersection oracle ==
If there is a DO with an approximation factor of at most 2, then it is possible to build a set intersection oracle (SIO) with query time $O(1)$ and space requirements $O(N+n)$, where n is the number of sets and N the sum of their sizes; see set intersection oracle#Reduction to approximate distance oracle.

It is believed that the SIO problem does not have a non-trivial solution. I.e., it requires $\Omega(n^2)$ space to answer queries in time $O(1)$, e.g. using an n-by-n table with the intersection between each two sets. If this conjecture is true, this implies that there is no DO with an approximation factor of less than 2 and a constant query time.
