= Stephen Warshall =

American mathematician

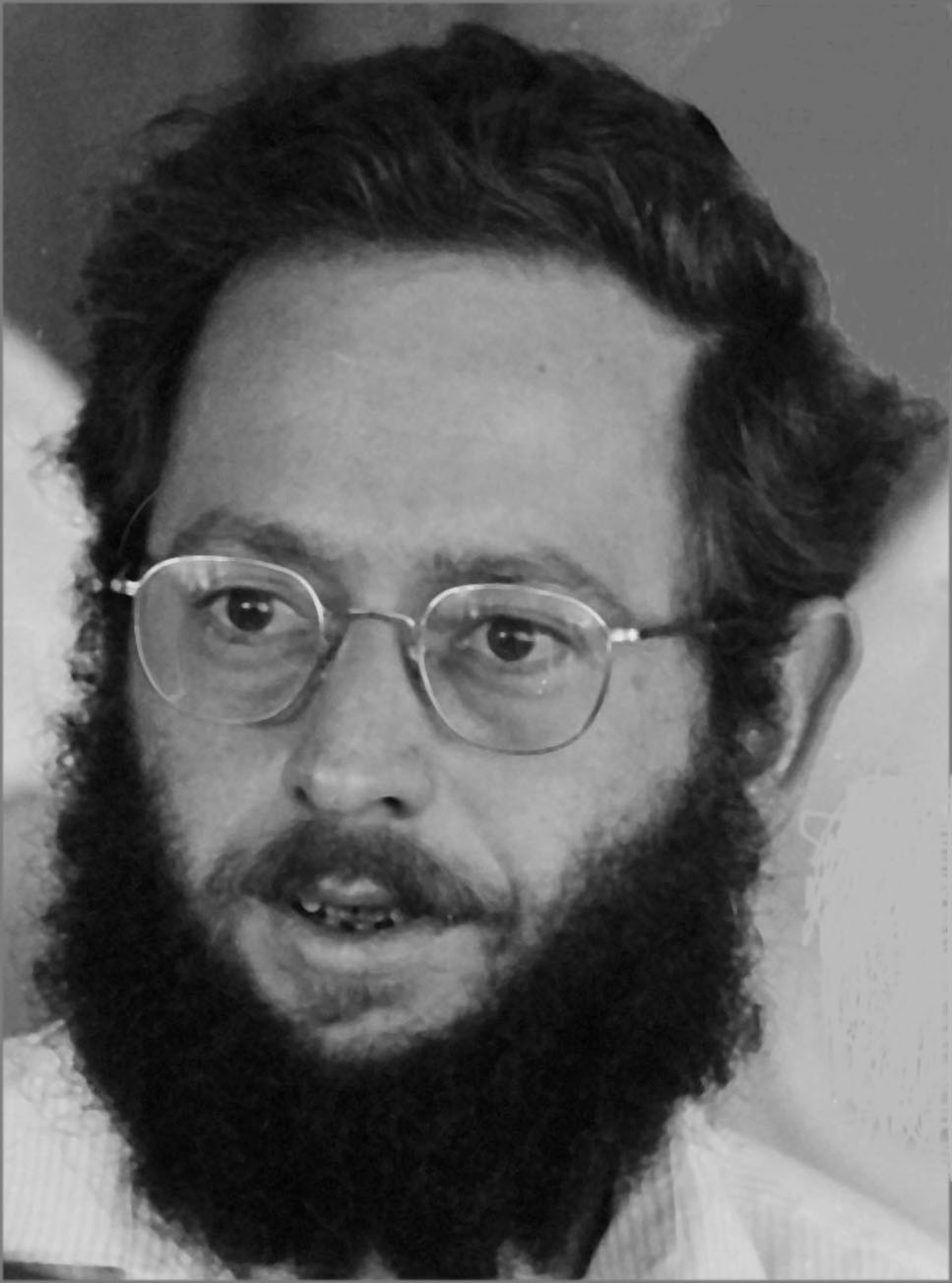
- Born: November 15, 1935; New York City
- Died: December 11, 2006 (aged 71); Gloucester, MA
- Known for: Floyd–Warshall algorithm

Stephen Warshall (November 15, 1935 – December 11, 2006) was an American computer scientist. During his career, Warshall carried out research and development in operating systems, compiler design, language design, and operations research. Warshall died on December 11, 2006, of cancer at his home in Gloucester, Massachusetts. He is survived by his wife, Sarah Dunlap, and two children, Andrew D. Warshall and Sophia V. Z. Warshall.

== Early life ==
Warshall was born in New York City and went to public school in Brooklyn. He graduated from A.B. Davis High School in Mount Vernon, New York, and attended Harvard University, receiving a bachelor's degree in mathematics in 1956. He never received an advanced degree since at that time no programs were available in his areas of interest. However, he took graduate courses at several different universities and contributed to the development of computer science and software engineering. In the 1971–1972 academic year, he lectured on software engineering at French universities.

== Employment ==
After graduating from Harvard, Warshall worked at ORO (Operation Research Office), a program set up by Johns Hopkins to do research and development for the United States Army. In 1958, he left ORO to take a position at a company called Technical Operations, where he helped build a research and development laboratory for military software projects. In 1961, he left Technical Operations to found Massachusetts Computer Associates. Later, this company became part of Applied Data Research (ADR). After the merger, Warshall sat on the board of directors of ADR and managed a variety of projects and organizations. He retired from ADR in 1982 and taught a weekly class in Biblical Hebrew at Temple Ahavat Achim in Gloucester, Massachusetts.

== Warshall's algorithm ==
There is an interesting anecdote about his proof that the transitive closure algorithm, now known as Warshall's algorithm, is correct. He and a colleague at Technical Operations bet a bottle of rum on who first could determine whether this algorithm always works. Warshall came up with his proof overnight, winning the bet and the rum, which he shared with the loser of the bet. Because Warshall did not like sitting at a desk, he did much of his creative work in unconventional places such as on a sailboat in the Indian Ocean or in a Greek lemon orchard.

== See also ==
- Warshall's algorithm
