= MWU =

MWU may refer to

- Merriam-Webster Unabridged, edition of Webster's Dictionary
- Midwestern University
- Mine Workers' Union, predecessor of Solidarity (South African trade union)
- Multiplicative weight update method, an algorithm design technique
- Mann-Whitney U Test
