= Mirror descent =

Concept in mathematics

In mathematics, mirror descent is an iterative optimization algorithm for finding a local minimum of a differentiable function.

It generalizes algorithms such as gradient descent and multiplicative weights.

== History ==
Mirror descent was originally proposed by Nemirovski and Yudin in 1983.

== Motivation ==
In gradient descent with the sequence of learning rates $(\eta_n)_{n \geq 0}$ applied to a differentiable function $F$, one starts with a guess $\mathbf{x}_0$ for a local minimum of $F,$ and considers the sequence $\mathbf{x}_0, \mathbf{x}_1, \mathbf{x}_2, \ldots$ such that

$$\mathbf{x}_{n+1}=\mathbf{x}_n-\eta_n \nabla F(\mathbf{x}_n),\ n \ge 0.$$

This can be reformulated by noting that

$$\mathbf{x}_{n+1}=\arg \min_{\mathbf{x}} \left(F(\mathbf{x}_n) + \nabla F(\mathbf{x}_n)^T (\mathbf{x} - \mathbf{x}_n) + \frac{1}{2 \eta_n}\|\mathbf{x} - \mathbf{x}_n\|^2\right)$$

In other words, $\mathbf{x}_{n+1}$ minimizes the first-order approximation to $F$ at $\mathbf{x}_n$ with added proximity term $\|\mathbf{x} - \mathbf{x}_n\|^2$.

This squared Euclidean distance term is a particular example of a Bregman distance. Using other Bregman distances will yield other algorithms such as Hedge which may be more suited to optimization over particular geometries.

== Formulation ==
We are given convex function $f$ to optimize over a convex set $K \subset \mathbb{R}^n$, and given some norm $\|\cdot\|$ on $\mathbb{R}^n$.

We are also given differentiable convex function $h \colon \mathbb{R}^n \to \mathbb{R}$, $\alpha$-strongly convex with respect to the given norm. This is called the distance-generating function, and its gradient $\nabla h \colon \mathbb{R}^n \to \mathbb{R}^n$ is known as the mirror map.

Starting from initial $x_0 \in K$, in each iteration of Mirror Descent:

- Map to the dual space: $\theta_t \leftarrow \nabla h (x_t)$
- Update in the dual space using a gradient step: $\theta_{t+1} \leftarrow \theta_t - \eta_t \nabla f(x_t)$
- Map back to the primal space: $x'_{t+1} \leftarrow (\nabla h)^{-1}(\theta_{t+1})$
- Project back to the feasible region $K$: $x_{t+1} \leftarrow \mathrm{arg}\min_{x \in K}D_h(x||x'_{t+1})$, where $D_h$ is the Bregman divergence.

== Connections with other methods and extensions ==
Mirror descent is related to natural gradient in information geometry and Riemannian gradient descent.

Mirror descent in the online optimization setting is known as Online Mirror Descent (OMD).

== See also ==
- Gradient descent
- Multiplicative weight update method
- Hedge algorithm
- Bregman divergence
