= Boolean-valued =

Boolean-valued usually refers to:

- in most applied fields: something taking one of two values (example: True or False, On or Off, 1 or 0) referring to two-element Boolean algebra (the Boolean domain), e.g. Boolean-valued function or Boolean data type
- in mathematics: something taking values over an arbitrary, abstract Boolean algebra, for example Boolean-valued model

== See also ==
- Boolean algebra further explains the distinction
