= LKH =

LKH may refer to:

- Lakha language (ISO 639-3 code: LKH), a Southern Tibetic language
- Lin–Kernighan heuristic, method for solving the traveling salesman problem
- Long Akah Airport, Sarawak, Malaysia, IATA code
