= Robert A. Bosch =

Professor of Mathematics

Robert A. (Bob) Bosch (born August 13, 1963, in Buffalo NY) is an author, recreational mathematician and the James F. Clark Professor of Mathematics at Oberlin College. He is known for domino art and for combining graph theory and mathematical optimization to design connect-the-dots eye candy: labyrinths, knight's tours, string art and TSP Art.

He is the author of Opt Art: From Mathematical Optimization to Visual Design.

== Education and career ==
Bosch received a BA in mathematics at Oberlin College in 1985, an MS in operations research and statistics at Rensselaer Polytechnic Institute in 1987 and a PhD in operations research where he completed his thesis titled, Partial Updating in Interior-Point Methods for Linear Programming under Kurt Martin Anstreicher at Yale University in 1991.

He has been at Oberlin College since 1991 where he teaches mathematics, statistics and computer science.

== Combining art and mathematics ==
Bosch is passionate about using computers and mathematical optimization techniques to design visual art. He refers to this work as "Opt Art." He has written dozens of papers on this topic, many of them with Oberlin College student collaborators. Over the years, Bosch has created numerous portraits drawn with a single continuous line. Some of these drawings are solutions of the Traveling salesman problem (or solutions to related problems). Examples include the "figurative tours" he created with computer scientist Tom Wexler and renditions of Leonardo da Vinci's Mona Lisa, Vincent Van Gogh's self-portrait, and Johannes Vermeer's Girl with a Pearl Earring.

Domino portraits such as his renderings of Martin Luther King and Barack Obama are an expansion of the mathematical genre of opt art.

== Awards ==
- 2007 Trevor Evans Award from the Mathematical Association of America (MAA), for the Math Horizons article "Opt Art".
- 2012 Inaugural Outstanding Paper Award from the Journal of Mathematics and the Arts, for the article "Simple-Close-Curve Sculptures of Knots and Links".
- 2010 First Prize in the Mathematical Art Exhibition of The American Mathematical Society (AMS), for the sculpture Embrace.
