= Multi-fragment algorithm =

Travelling salesman problem heuristic

- Class: Approximation algorithm
- Data structure: Graph
- Worst-case performance: $\Theta(N^2 \log N)$
- Optimal: No

The multi-fragment (MF) algorithm is a heuristic or approximation algorithm for the travelling salesman problem (TSP) (and related problems). This algorithm is also sometimes called the "greedy algorithm" for the TSP.

The algorithm builds a tour for the traveling salesman one edge at a time and thus maintains multiple tour fragments, each of which is a simple path in the complete graph of cities. At each stage, the algorithm selects the edge of minimal cost that either creates a new fragment, extends one of the existing paths or creates a cycle of length equal to the number of cities.
