= Highway network optimization =

Design of highway systems to maximize utility

Highway network optimization is the problem of configuring highway networks to maximize economic and social utility. Numerous mathematical optimization techniques have been brought to bear on the problem, including linear programming and deep learning.

Recent research has included work on treating the highway optimization problem as a dynamic system.

== See also ==
- Traffic engineering
- Transit route network design problem
- Liner shipping network design and scheduling problem
