= Nicos Christofides =

Cypriot mathematician and professor (1942–2019)

Nicos Christofides (born 1942 in Cyprus; died 2019) was a Cypriot mathematician and professor of financial mathematics at Imperial College London.

Christofides studied electrical engineering at Imperial College London, where he also received his PhD in 1966 (dissertation: The origin of load losses in induction motors with cast aluminium rotors). He was briefly with Associated Electrical Industries and then again at Imperial College.

In 1976, he devised the Christofides algorithm, an algorithm for finding approximate solutions to the travelling salesman problem. The Christofides algorithm is considered "groundbreaking" and has collected over 2200 citations.

In 1982, he rejoined Imperial College London as a professor of operations research. In 1990, he was the co-founder and director of the Centre for Quantitative Finance (now the Institute for Financial Engineering). Christofides became Professor Emeritus of Quantitative Finance at Imperial College London in 2009. He died in 2019.
