= Eunice Santos =

American computer scientist

Eunice E. Santos is an American computer scientist. After early research on parallel algorithms, her more recent research has concerned computational aspects of social networks, complex adaptive systems, and modeling the behavior of humans interacting with these systems.

== Early life and education ==
Santos is originally from Ohio. She is the daughter of two academics at Youngstown State University: her father, Eugene S. Santos, was a professor of mathematics and computer science, and her mother, Evelyn Santos, was a lecturer in mathematics and electrical engineering. Her brother, Eugene Santos Jr., became a professor of computer engineering at Dartmouth College.

She began her studies at Youngstown State University at age 13, majored in mathematics and computer science there, and graduated at age 17 in 1989. Next, she went to the University of California, Berkeley for graduate study in computer science, earning a master's degree and completing her Ph.D. in 1995 under the supervision of Richard M. Karp. Her dissertation Studies of Parallel Complexity within the LogP Model was based on her work with Karp and others introducing and analyzing the LogP machine, an abstract model of parallel computation.

== Career ==
She became a faculty member at Virginia Tech and at Lehigh University, and a researcher at the Center for Technology and National Security Policy in the US Institute for National Strategic Studies, before moving to the University of Texas at El Paso as chair of the computer science department, director of the National Center for Border Security and Immigration, and director of the Center for Defense Systems Research. In 2014, she became founding co-editor-in-chief of the journal IEEE Transactions on Computational Social Systems.

Next, in 2015, she moved to the Illinois Institute of Technology as professor of computer science and Ron Hochsprung Endowed Chair, before serving as dean of the School of Information Sciences at the University of Illinois Urbana-Champaign from August 2019 until January 2025.

== Recognition ==
Santos was a 2010 recipient of the Technical Achievement Award of the IEEE Computer Society, given "for pioneering contributions to Computational Social Network Systems". In 2019, she became the inaugural recipient of the IEEE Big Data Security Woman of Achievement Award. She was elected as an IEEE Fellow, in the 2023 class of fellows, "for leadership in computational social networks".
