= Liner shipping network design and scheduling problem =

Optimization problem for maritime transportation

The liner shipping network design and problem (LSNDP) is a mathematical optimization problem in operations research that models maritime transport logistic problems. It is of practical interest in the shipping industry, as improvements in mathematical techniques can be directly applied to real-world problems.

The problem consist of two subproblems; 1) designing feasible services, and 2) flowing the container flows through the network.

An industry-standard benchmark dataset, LINERLIB, is used to measure the effectiveness of mathematical approaches to the LSNDSP.

== See also ==
- Transshipment
- Transit route network design problem
- Highway network optimization
