= Transit route network design problem =

Mathematical optimization problem for bus and rail transport

The transit route network design problem is a mathematical optimization problem in the context of transportation networks with well-defined stops, routes and timetables such as bus and railway networks.

The problem can be broken down into five subproblems: transportation network design, frequency setting, timetable development, vehicle scheduling, and crew scheduling.

== See also ==
- Liner shipping network design and scheduling problem
- Highway network optimization
