= Antonia J. Jones =

British mathematician and computer scientist

Antonia Jane Jones
- Born: 1943
- Died: 2010 (aged 66–67)
- Education: University of Reading; University of Cambridge
- Scientific career
- Workplaces: Cardiff University
- Thesis: Sums of roots of unity and cyclic overlattices (1968)
- Website: Antonia J. Jones

Antonia Jane Jones (1943 – 2010) was a British mathematician and computer scientist. Her research considered number theory and computer science.

== Early life and education ==
Jones was born in 1943 in Queen Charlotte's and Chelsea Hospital. She was the first member of her family to attend university. Jones contracted polio as a child and lost both of her legs at the age of ten. Jones attended the University of Reading, where she studied mathematics and physics and graduated both with first class honours. She was a doctoral student in number theory at the University of Cambridge, where she completed her PhD in 1969. Jones joined the University of Nottingham after earning her doctorate, before joining Imperial College London as a Senior Lecturer. She spent a year at the Institute for Advanced Study, after which she joined the faculty at the University of Colorado Boulder.

== Research and career ==
Jones returned to the United Kingdom in the 1970s, where she became a lecturer at Royal Holloway, University of London. Her interest switched from mathematics to computing and she began to explore acoustic pattern recognition. Whilst Jones struggled with the early computers, when technology became more accessible for people with physical disabilities she launched her own firm creating random access video controllers.

In 1983 Jones joined Brunel University London at a lecturer in Information Technology. Jones later served as Professor of Evolutionary and Neural Computing at Cardiff University. She exposed various security loopholes in banking infrastructure, including identifying significant potential fraud at HSBC.

Alongside her scientific research, Jones was involved with science communication and public engagement. She served as an electronic data consultant on the 1986 film Rocinante. She contributed to the 1998 British Science Association Festival of Science. In 2007, Jones retired from Cardiff University.

== Selected publications ==
- Kevin E Ashelford; Nadia A Chuzhanova; John C Fry; Antonia J Jones; Andrew J Weightman (1 September 2006). "New screening software shows that most recent large 16S rRNA gene clone libraries contain chimeras". Applied and Environmental Microbiology. 72 (9): 5734–5741. doi:10.1128/aem.00556-06. ISSN 0099-2240. PMC 1563593. PMID 16957188. Wikidata Q33256604.
- Kevin E Ashelford; Nadia A Chuzhanova; John C Fry; Antonia J Jones; Andrew J Weightman (1 December 2005). "At least 1 in 20 16S rRNA sequence records currently held in public repositories is estimated to contain substantial anomalies". Applied and Environmental Microbiology. 71 (12): 7724–7736. doi:10.1128/aem.71.12.7724-7736.2005. ISSN 0099-2240. PMC 1317345. PMID 16332745. Wikidata Q33228706.
- Stefánsson, Adoalbjörn; Končar, N.; Jones, Antonia J. (1 September 1997). "A note on the Gamma test". Neural Computing & Applications. 5 (3): 131–133. doi:10.1007/BF01413858. ISSN 1433-3058. S2CID 11348191.
- Jones, A. J. (Antonia Jane), 1943- (2000). Game theory : mathematical models of conflict. Chichester [England]: Horwood Pub. ISBN 1-898563-14-4. OCLC 44654208.

== Personal life ==
Antonia Jones spent many years with her partner Barbara Quinn at their shared farmhouse in the Brecon Beacons. Upon her retirement in 2007, Jones moved to St. Augustine, Florida. Jones died on 23 December 2010. She is survived by Quinn and her sister Jenny Carrl.
