= MCPP =

MCPP may stand for:

- The Mackinac Center for Public Policy – an American free market think tank headquartered in Midland, Michigan
- Marine Corps Planning Process – a group planning process developed by the United States Marine Corps that is designed to help its units with staffs plan operations, and to provide input to operations planning with other military services
- mcpp – a C preprocessor
- Medical Cannabis Pilot Program Act (Illinois)
- meta-Chlorophenylpiperazine (mCPP) – a recreational drug and stimulant of the piperazine class; a metabolite of some commonly used antidepressants
- Methylchlorophenoxypropionic acid (Mecoprop) – a herbicide
- Mississippi Center for Public Policy
- Mixed Chinese postman problem – a search problem in mathematics
- The Modern Corporation and Private Property (1932) by AA Berle and GC Means
