= Former Jinan Railway Station =

Former railway station in Jinan, Shandong, China

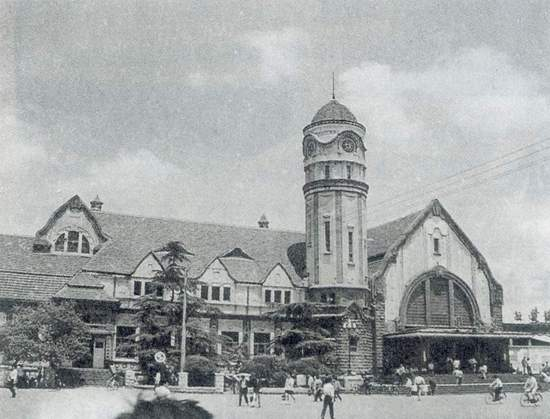
Viewing the station building from the side facing the street, 1912

The old Jinan Railway Station, situated on the Jinpu Railway, was originally located in the northeast corner of the former commercial port in Tianqiao District, Jinan City, Shandong Province. Locals commonly referred to it as the "Old Train Station". Construction of the station began in 1908 and was completed in 1912. The architect behind the design was Hermann Fischer, and it features typical German Jugendstil (Art Nouveau) style. Together with the surrounding Jinan Railway Bureau and Railway Hospital, the station formed a grand German-style architectural complex. As an important symbol of Jinan's past, the station witnessed the changes of the commercial port and even the entire city.

In the midst of the protests by citizens of Jinan, the old train station was demolished by the government in July 1992 under the pretext of "eliminating colonial symbols". Afterwards, a new station was built on the site. Since the demolition of Jinan's old train station, it has been frequently mentioned as a negative example in academic conferences on Chinese cultural heritage preservation, and criticized for the shortsightedness of forgetting the historical influence of the great powers instead of facing and admitting it in order to revitalize the city. It is a manifestation of an ostrich mentality and narrow nationalism. The old train station, which served the purpose of transportation for the people, did not have strong colonial connotations. Instead, it helped carry the country towards self-reliance and participated in the century-long urban development and transformation of Jinan. Many people believed that local leaders blindly destroyed such an outstanding historical building, cultural heritage, and landmark. The design of the new building was also not well received, and it created the impression that "beautiful designs can only be built by Europeans", which was contrary to the original purpose. Afterwards, the people of Shandong realized their mistake and called for the reconstruction of the old train station. However, there were also doubts about how to recreate it authentically. The Taiwan-based newspaper, "Wangbao," also reprinted an evaluation by the official Chinese newspaper, "People's Daily," stating that it was regrettable that irreversible losses had already occurred, and it would be better to build a monument for the protection of the ruins at the original site. This hasty demolition event is a profound lesson, which shows that future generations should not make the same mistake again.

== Architecture ==
The old train station is located to the south of the railway, with its main entrance facing south and its back facing north. The building is divided into two floors, east and west, and a clock tower, organized according to its functional use.

The old station building is located south of the railway, with a north-facing entrance. The architect organized the space according to its functional use, dividing the building into two floors: the east and west wings, as well as a bell tower.

The east wing, which serves as the station building, is about 3–4 meters tall and features a pointed gable and a 13-meter circular arch with a double-sloped roof made of tiles. Above the door frame, there is a large arched glass window with colorful stained glass. The roof has several small skylights with alternating triangular and semi-circular shapes under the eaves, which increase the interior brightness and add to the beauty of the exterior.

The building's walls are made of brick and stone, while the floors and roofs use red pine assembled with mortise and tenon joints. The unevenly shaped granite blocks at the corners, the wide granite steps outside the door, the dark green cypress trees planted in front of the windows, and the brown fence all add to the station's elegance and weight.

To the east of the waiting room is a low, green dome roof that was originally the ticket office

The West building is a row of three-story auxiliary buildings, and the attic's gentle curved walls form a continuous undulating line, which echoes the dome and arch windows of the waiting hall, emitting an overall sense of stability and smoothness.

The clock tower is cylindrical in shape, located between the east and west buildings with one underground floor and eight aboveground floors, with a total height of 32 meters. The clock tower has a green-tiled dome and a mushroom stone wall; a small spiral staircase is installed inside the tower, and the facade is decorated with corresponding spiral long windows. According to workers who dismantled the old station building, the structure of the clock tower is very delicate and sturdy. There are German-style clocks on all four sides of the top of the tower, with a diameter of 1.3 meters; inside the clock machine room, there are slowly rising and falling iron chains, two 10-kilogram weights, and large and small gears that work together to drive the 4.5-kilogram hour hand and 6-kilogram minute hand to accurately tell the time for more than 80 years. Every 24 hours, the two weights placed on the tray will drop by the height of one floor. At 9:30 am every Saturday, the two weights will descend to the bottom of the clock tower, and then the maintenance personnel of the clock tower will lift the two weights to the top floor, then use the crank to "wind up" the weights by pulling the tray up and placing the weights on it. In this way, the clock tower completes the "winding" work and can continue to accurately tell the time. The clock tower's towering body reflects the religious beliefs of medieval Europe, and the four large clocks on the tower make it not only audible but also visible, providing convenience for travelers while satisfying visual enjoyment. Therefore, this clock tower has been a symbol of Jinan City for 80 years.

In addition to this old station building, the surrounding buildings such as the Jiaoji Railway Jinan Station (now a museum) and the Jinan Railway Hospital are all in German style, forming a German-style architectural complex together.

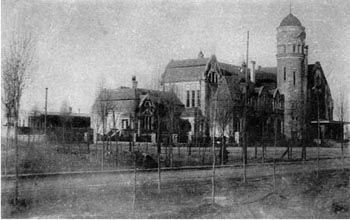
Jinan Station of Jinpu Railway in 1912

== History ==
=== Early stage of construction ===
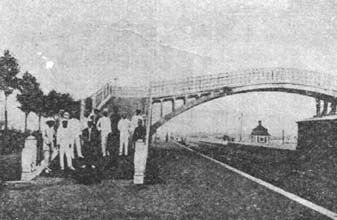
1908 Jinan Railway Station cross-road bridge

Jinan Station is located at the intersection of the Jingu and Biji Railways, in the central section where the two lines meet. As early as 1904, when the construction of the Jingu Railway was underway and the Biji Railway was nearing completion, the German-owned Shandong Railway Company and the Shandong Governor Zhou Fu agreed to use the Jinan Station of the Biji Railway as a shared hub for both the lines, designating it as the central station of Jinan city. However, the management of the Jingu Railway insisted on not allowing the German side to interfere with the rights of the Jingu Railway, and eventually chose to build a new station north of the original Biji Railway station. Thus, the situation of setting up two stations for two railways in one city is rare in other Chinese cities. The area around the train station quickly became a bustling area with a dense flow of people, becoming the gateway for outsiders to enter the commercial port.

=== Jiaozhi (Jinan-Qingdao) Railway Linkage ===
On April 9, 1911, the management of Jiaozhi Railway and Jinpu Railway reached an agreement on the use of railway facilities. Two connecting lines were built between the two Jinan stations, as well as pedestrian overpasses and underground passages for carts and pedestrians to pass through.

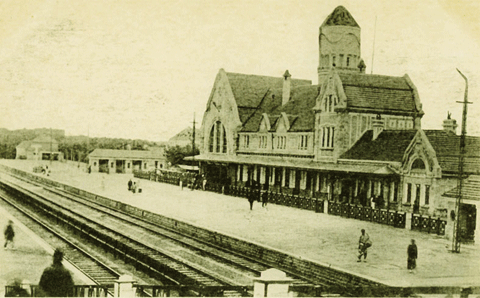
View of the Station Building from the Railway Side, 1930

=== Merge ===
After the Marco Polo Bridge Incident in 1937, Jinan was in danger and many citizens flocked to the two Jinan stations, hoping to escape by railway. On November 15 of that year, Lao She also fled from this station to Xuzhou. After the Japanese occupation of Jinan at the end of 1937, in order to cooperate with the zonal management, the two stations were renovated and expanded. In the following year, the station yard of Jiaozhi Railway Jinan Station was closed, and its business was integrated into the Jinpu Railway Jinan Station. In 1939, the two railways were connected, and Jiaozhi Railway was rerouted to connect to Jinpu Railway Jinan Station at 391.07 kilometers. Jinpu Railway Jinan Station became a large station used jointly by the two main railway lines, while Jiaozhi Railway Jinan Station was converted into the headquarters of Jinan Railway Bureau.

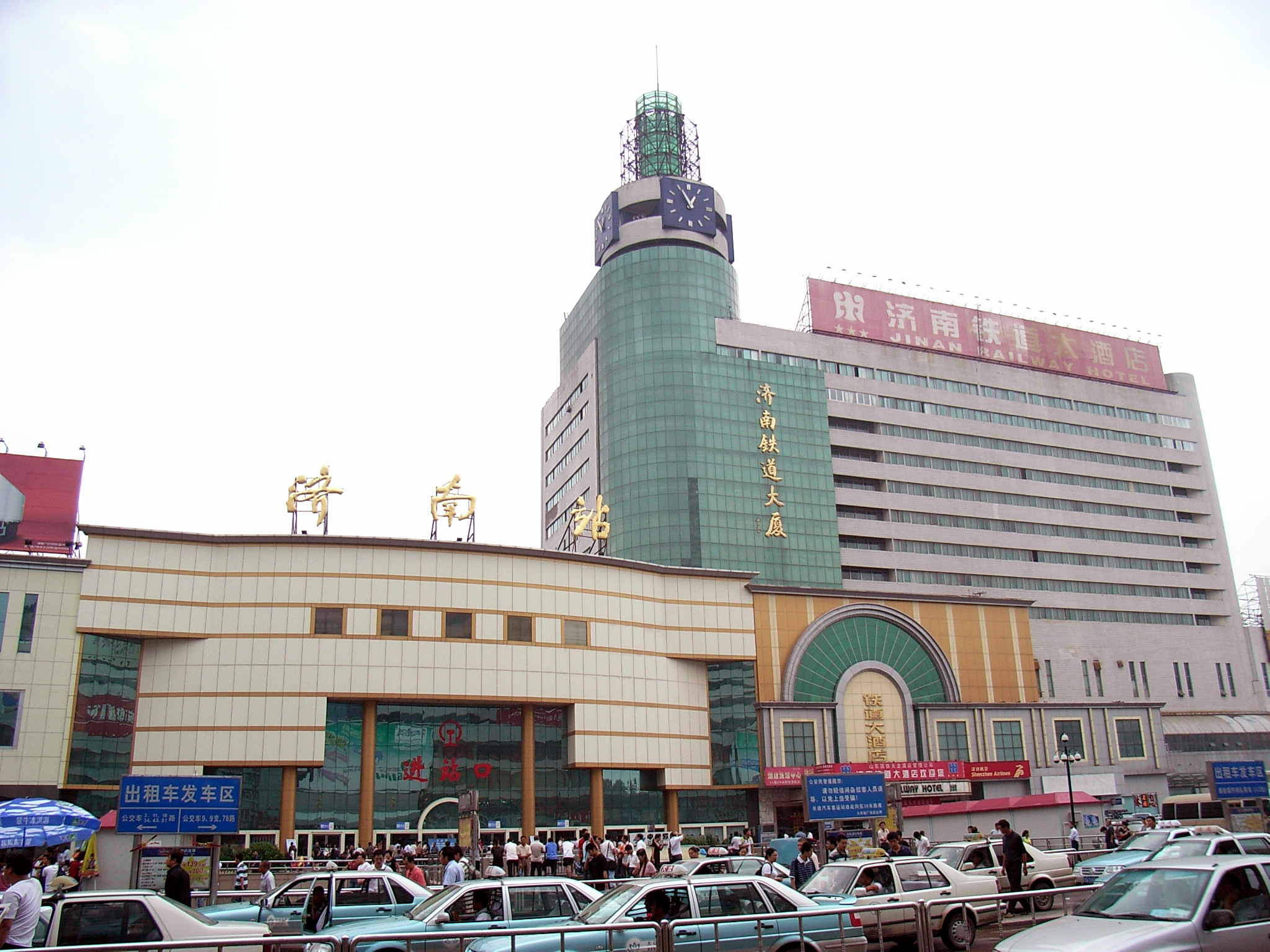
Jinan Railway Station newly built in 1995

=== Reconstruction ===
In 1958, partial reconstruction was carried out on the railway station, and a two-story waiting room that could accommodate 4,000 people was built on the west side to increase capacity. During the Cultural Revolution, the clock tower was protected by the clock tower management personnel, who put two locks on the clock machine room and painted the pendulum black to avoid the danger of being attacked. In 1972, a "welcoming gate" was built to welcome Prince Norodom Sihanouk of Cambodia who visited Jinan. The gate was an exit that led directly from the platform to the station square in front of the station.

By 1985, the area of the old station building was a total of 8,528 square meters

=== Demolition ===
==== Discussion ====
Due to the increasing passenger flow that the old station could not accommodate and the need to integrate railway construction and urban development in Jinan, in 1989, there was a heated debate among decision-makers and experts over whether to renovate the old station or to demolish it completely and build a new one. Many people suggested preserving it as a museum, but the Jinan Municipal Committee persisted in the opinion of demolition. The then-mayor of Jinan, Xie Yutang, cited "it as a symbol of colonialism, reminding people of the years when the Chinese people were oppressed" and "the green dome of the clock tower is like a Nazi helmet, which is not beautiful" as the reasons for the demolition.

In January 1990, Zhang Tongsheng, the then director of Jinan Railway Bureau, proposed a plan to rebuild the station building when accompanying the Minister of Railways Li Senmao on an inspection tour, and immediately received the reply "you can rebuild it." Subsequently, the Jinan Railway Bureau consulted both the Shandong Province and Jinan City governments on the issue of whether to keep or demolish the clock tower. Both sides expressed their agreement to demolish it. In April 1991, the Ministry of Railways also approved the plan to demolish the old station building.

Before the demolition began, the People's Congress and Political Consultative Conference of Jinan city raised questions, but after seeing official documents from multiple departments, they no longer opposed it.

==== Start dismantling ====
In March 1992, the demolition plan was finally confirmed. On July 1, the demolition of the train station began; at 8:05 am that day, the clock of the bell tower stopped running. At 8:20, the demolition work officially began. The demolition was carried out manually, starting from the roof by removing tiles, doors, and windows. At the beginning of the demolition, many citizens gathered to watch, and some students challenged the necessity of the demolition to the project's commanders. After the construction site was fenced off, it became difficult for passers-by to see the situation of the building.

Due to the station's proximity to the railway, large machinery could not be used, so the demolition work had to be done manually. And due to the sturdy materials used in the old station building, it took about six months for the building to be completely demolished.

After the demolition of the old railway station, the building materials that were removed are of unknown whereabouts. Only the large clock on the bell tower is still preserved in the warehouse of the Jinan Railway Bureau. On June 8, 1995, the new station built on the site of the old station was put into use, but it was called "neither Chinese nor Western with no characteristics" by some people in Jinan.

== Influence ==
The train station was widely praised by architects and people at home and abroad when it was first built, becoming the most famous train station in the Far East. Many out-of-towners first came to know Jinan through the old train station, and only after remembering the old train station did they remember Jinan. The post-World War II travel guide "Traveling in the Far East" published in West Germany listed this train station as the "first stop in the Far East." Lao She taught at Qilu University in the early 1930s and lived in Jinan for four and a half years. The train station, which was mentioned multiple times in his works, was also used as an exterior location in the movie "The Stormy Waves" set in the late 1920s.

After the completion of Jinan Station on the Jinpu Railway, the relatively crude Jinan Station on the Jiaozhou-Jinan Railway was left "in the shade". Stimulated by this, the Shandong Railway Company immediately began to renovate the original station and built a new station building in 1915, located directly south of Jinan Station on the Jinpu Railway.

In the field of architecture, this train station became a typical example of railway station design at that time. Architectural textbooks at Tsinghua University and Tongji University have used it as a model. This building has also been a required course for foreign architecture scholars. In a university in the UK, a professor spent a full 40 minutes introducing this train station.

Professor Zhang Runwu of Shandong University of Architecture believes that, from the combination of masses, the shaping of individuals, to the exquisite details, the old station building is undoubtedly one of the excellent transportation buildings in the world in the early 20th century. It is a building work that can be compared with famous European train stations at that time, and it holds an important position in the history of modern Chinese architecture.

The German scholar Torsten Warner believes that the old station building of Jinan Station is the best example of the German Jugendstil style in China.

Before the demolition of the train station, many citizens flocked to it in order to take another look at the old station that held an important place in their lives. Many families even went together, with the elderly and children, to take group photos and leave lasting memories. After the new station building was completed and Jinan Station was put back into use, the famous actor Yu Yang once traveled to Jinan by train for business. When the train arrived at Jinan Station, he couldn't believe that he had arrived because "the station was so beautiful and had a clock tower built by a German." When he learned that the old station building had been demolished, he sat silently on the train for a long time.

=== Criticism of the demolition ===
The demolition of the train station has been regarded as a regrettable event by some scholars and experts, who often mention it. Some scholars have even sharply criticized it as the "top among China's ten barbaric engineering projects" and as a "lack of cultural expression." Similar demolitions of outstanding modern architecture occurred frequently in the 1990s. In addition to the train station, buildings such as the Japanese Kempeitai headquarters in Jinan and the German Telegraph Office were also demolished during the same period. The reasons for these demolitions were driven by both economic interests and ideological perspectives. Initially, China's focus on the protection of cultural heritage was primarily limited to revolutionary relics and ancient buildings, while the significance of modern cultural heritage often went unnoticed. There was a lack of clear understanding and public support for its preservation.

=== 纪念 ===
In June 2008, the dismantled clock—the hands of which still pointed to 8:05—was discovered. In June 2008, the dismantled clock was found in a warehouse at the Jinan Railway Bureau. The clock face, hands, and gears remained intact, while the smaller components were stored in nearby cardboard boxes.，However, the base of the clock had already been damaged. Currently, the components of the large clock are preserved as exhibits in the Jiaoji Railway Museum.

On September 20, 2012, private collector Xu Guowei showcased the blueprint of the old station building to a reporter from Jinan Daily and expressed his willingness to provide the blueprint for its reconstruction.

2On the morning of December 5, 2012, Shandong University of Architecture invited Westivia Fischer, the granddaughter of the designer of the old station building, to participate in the "Fischer and Jinan Railway Station, as well as Shandong University of Architecture Architectural Cultural Heritage Photo Exhibition." She showcased multiple photographs of the old station building.

After retiring, Gao Demin, an architect from Jinan, became a painter. His debut piece, "Memory: Jinpu Railway Jinan Station," took him seven months to complete. He also created several oil paintings, including "The Old Station" and "The Chime of the Old Train Station." In 2016, Gao gifted "The Old Station" to Ms. Westivia Fischer, and it is now permanently exhibited at the Fischer Memorial Museum in Berlin.

== Architecture ==
Due to the lasting impression the old station building of Jinan Station has left on the city's residents, the architectural community, and the heritage conservation field, there have been numerous proposals in recent years to rebuild the old station building. However, these plans have faced criticism from certain experts.

=== Proposals ===
During the "Two Sessions" in Jinan in 2010, Cui Anyuan, a member of the Municipal Political Consultative Conference and then the Deputy General Manager of Jinan Construction Group, proposed the reconstruction of the old Jinan Railway Station. In 2012, Liu Jingtao, the Director of the Urban and Rural Construction Committee of Tianqiao District, along with 11 other representatives of the Jinan Municipal People's Congress, submitted a proposal titled "Accelerating the Construction of the North Square of the Railway Station and the Reconstruction of the Former Clock Tower." They called for the prompt initiation of the reconstruction of the old station building.

In December 2012, Shandong University of Architecture showcased a section of the "German-style Station Architecture" on the construction drawing of the "Railway Industry and Architecture Exhibition Base." This section was specifically inspired by the old station building of Jinan Station.

On August 1, 2013, Jinan Old City Development Investment Group announced its plan to invest 1.5 billion yuan in the construction of Jinan Railway Station North Square. The project included the reconstruction of the clock tower, station building, and luggage room that were dismantled 21 years ago. The reconstructed station building will occupy only 1.7% of the total area of the North Square. The Jinan municipal government stated that the reconstructed old station building would be presented to the citizens in its original form, showcasing its authentic charm. The news triggered intense debates, and there was no further information regarding the official planning map that was originally scheduled to be released by the end of August. The staff of Jinan Railway Bureau stated that the plan is entirely the responsibility of the Jinan municipal government, and Jinan Railway Bureau was not involved in it.

=== Controversy ===
Upon learning that the dismantled old station building would be rebuilt, many people, driven by their emotional attachment to the structure, expressed joy at the prospect of seeing the old station building reemerge. According to Li Ming, the director of Jinan Archaeological Research Institute, the reconstruction of the old station building can serve as a "warning to future generations" and remind them that "we once held mistaken attitudes." Professor Zhang Runwu believes that the old station building encompasses various aspects of its construction era, and the reconstruction of the old station building would be beneficial for the development of Jinan as a "historical and cultural city." Xu Guowei believes that the technology for reconstructing the old station building is already available, but great caution must be exercised in handling the details. In addition, some elderly citizens expressed that the old train station holds countless memories and emotions for them. Rebuilding the old station building would revive their recollections of the past. Jinan Times conducted a public opinion poll on their client app titled "Restoring Jinan Old Train Station: What's Your View?" By January 2, 2017, a total of 1,637 people supported the reconstruction, while 834 people opposed it.

On the other hand, many experts in the fields of architecture and cultural heritage preservation hold a negative stance. They express concerns that the reconstruction may not accurately replicate the intricate details of the old station building, nor continue its cultural and historical significance. Professor Jiang Bo from Shandong University of Architecture stated that achieving an "authentic" restoration requires in-depth research and solid technical support, which the construction project of Jinan Station North Square has not adequately prepared for. Professor Deng Xiangchao from Shandong University of Architecture stated that with the demolition of the old station building, the continuity of its cultural heritage has been severed, and the reconstructed structure would merely be a "fake antique." Cultural heritage conservation expert Xie Chensheng also cited a violation of the "Law on Protection of Cultural Relics" as a reason. Opposition to this reconstruction plan. On December 21, 2016, People's Daily also published a relevant commentary, stating that blind reconstruction cannot fully restore the original architecture nor revive the cultural significance it once carried. It suggested that setting up a memorial monument to serve as a warning to future generations would be more effective.

Furthermore, some individuals have expressed dissatisfaction with the chosen location for the reconstruction plan, arguing that the new building on the North Square of Jinan Station is disconnected from the German-style architectural complex on the south side of the railway. Moreover, it is far removed from the original commercial area of Jinan, significantly diminishing the significance of the reconstruction.

== Architecture ==
- Jinan railway station
- The old site of Jinan Railway Station on the Jiaoji Railway
- The old site of Taian Railway Station on the Jinpu Railway
