= Talent =

Talent has two principal meanings:

- Talent (measurement), an ancient unit of mass and value
- Aptitude or talent, a group of aptitudes useful for some activities; talents may refer to aptitudes themselves or to possessors of those talents

Talent may also refer to:

== Arts, entertainment, and media ==
=== Literature ===
- Talent (play), a 1978 play by Victoria Wood
- Talent, the first novel in The Talent Series by Zoey Dean

=== Television ===
- Got Talent, a series of television shows, in several national versions
- Young Talent Time (1971-1989; 2012), an Australian television variety program on Network Ten

=== Other arts, entertainment, and media ===
- Talent (artwork), a seminal work of art by David Robbins, 1986
- Talent (comics), a comic book series written by Christopher Golden and Tom Sngoski and drawn by Paul Azaceta, 2006
- Talent (group), a US R&B group from Kansas City, who formed in 1998
- Billy Talent, a Canadian rock group from Toronto, who formed in 1993
- Talents universe, a setting in Anne McCaffrey's science fiction, where Talents are members of the fictional psionic professions
- "Hidden Talent", an episode of Kim Possible's second season

== Other uses ==
- Attic talent, also known as the Athenian talent or Greek talent, an ancient unit of mass or value equal to this amount of pure silver
- Talent (horse), a racehorse
- Bombardier Talent, a type of multiple unit passenger train manufactured by Bombardier
- Talent, Oregon, a city in Jackson County, Oregon, United States
- Jim Talent (born 1956), American politician, former Senator from Missouri
- Talent management, the management of human capital within an organisation
- People who work in entertainment or broadcasting, as in talent agent
- Talent scheduling, an optimization problem in computer science and operations research.
