= Timefold =

Timefold is a Belgian software company that provides a platform for automated planning and scheduling optimization. It is headquartered in Ghent, Belgium.

== History ==
Timefold's technology originated with OptaPlanner, an open-source constraint solver created by Geoffrey De Smet in the mid-2000s and later maintained by Red Hat. In late 2022, Red Hat announced it would end support for the project. In response, De Smet and Maarten Vandenbroucke founded Timefold BV in early 2023, forking the OptaPlanner codebase to create the Timefold Solver.

In March 2023, Timefold secured a €2 million pre-seed investment led by the Belgian venture fund Smartfin. Timefold was officially launched in mid-2023. In September 2024, it raised an additional €6 million in a seed funding round led by the European venture firm Lakestar, with participation from Smartfin. The funding was used for the development of PlanningAI.

== Timefold Solver ==
Timefold operates under a commercial open-source model. The core Timefold Solver is available under an Apache License. The Solver uses constraint solving algorithms and heuristic search techniques to solve complex optimization problems such as Vehicle Routing Problems (VRP) and shift scheduling problems. It allows users to define planning constraints using programming languages such as Java and Kotlin.
