= Wei Dongyi =

Chinese mathematician and Ph.D. at Peking University 2018

- Born: 1992 (age 33–34); Jinan, Shandong, China
- Education: Peking University (BS, PhD)
- Scientific career
- Fields: Mathematics
- Workplaces: Peking University
- Doctoral advisor: Tian Gang

Wei Dongyi (Chinese: 韦东奕; pinyin: Wéi Dōngyì; born in 1992) is a Chinese mathematician. He is an associate professor and assistant researcher of mathematical science at Peking University.

He has attracted attention on Chinese social media for his simple living style. In 2021, he was called Peking University's "ugliest teacher" due to his unkempt appearance.

== Education ==
Wei Dongyi was born in Lixia, Jinan in June 8th, 1992. His father Wei Zhongli (韦忠礼, 1963-2016) originally from Dongyang, Zhejiang, and was an alumnus of Shandong University with bachelor, master, and doctoral degrees in mathematics; he later served as a professor in Shandong Jianzhu University and Shandong University. His mother Yu Zhen (俞蓁, 1965-) is also a professor in Shandong Jianzhu University.

Wei entered Attached Senior School of Shandong Normal University in 2007, and during the high school, he won gold medal in International Mathematical Olympiad representing People's Republic of China twice in 2008 and 2009; with that grade, we as admitted in Peking University. Wei began attending Peking University in 2010. He earned his Bachelor of Science in 2014 and his Ph.D. in mathematics from the university in 2018 under Tian Gang. His research fields includes partial differential equations and differential geometry.

In December 2019, Wei completed his post-doctoral work and became an assistant professor in the Mathematics Department of Peking University. In November 2025, he became an associate professor of the university.

== Internet fame ==
Wei Dongyi became viral on the internet from a street interview in May 2021 when he was seen dressed in an unassuming manner, holding a large bottle of drinking water and a bag of mantou (steamed buns). His appearance has led to netizens dubbing him the "sweeping monk" of Peking University.

A group of doctorate mathematicians had been struggling to build a mathematical model for months and called Wei Dongyi for help. He provided equations to alter their experiment which resulted in the mathematical model obtaining a 96% passing rate. The mathematicians wanted to pay the professor to show their gratitude, but he declined. "It’s unnecessary to pay me for such an easy problem," he said. Wei eventually asked for a recharge of his transport card as a form of compensation.

Wei Dongyi is nicknamed “God Wei” (韦神) by Chinese netizens.

== Selected academic works ==
- Wei Dongyi. "Regularity criterion to the axially symmetric Navier-Stokes equations". Journal of Mathematical Analysis and Applications. 435 (2016), no. 1, 402-413.
- Wendong Wang, Dongyi Wei, Zhifei Zhang. "Energy identity for approximate harmonic maps from surfaces to general targets", Journal of Functional Analysis. 272 (2017), 776-803.
- Wei Dongyi, Zhang Zhifei. "Global well-posedness of the MHD equations in a homogeneous magnetic field". Analysis & PDE . 10 (2017), no. 6, 1361-1406.
- Wei Dongyi, Zhang Zhifei, Zhao Weiren. "Linear inviscid damping for a class of monotone shear flow in Sobolev spaces". Communications on Pure and Applied Mathematics. 71 (2018), no. 4, 617-687.
- Wei Dongyi, Zhang Zhifei, Zhao Weiren. "Linear inviscid damping and vorticity depletion for shear flows". Annals of PDE. 5 (2019), no. 1, Art. 3, 101 pp.
- Shao, Feng, Dongyi Wei, and Zhifei Zhang. “On Blow-up for the Supercritical Defocusing Nonlinear Wave Equation.” Forum of Mathematics, Pi 13 (2025): e15. https://doi.org/10.1017/fmp.2025.7.
