= Shandong Normal University =

Chinese university in Shandong Province

- 山东师范大学
- Former name: Shandong Normal College
- Type: Public
- Established: 1950
- Officer in charge: Dr. Zhixiao Shang
- President: Dr. Bo Tang
- Students: around 37,000
- Location: Jinan, Shandong, China
- Nickname: Shanshi (山师)
- Website: www.sdnu.edu.cn

Shandong Normal University (simplified Chinese: 山东师范大学; traditional Chinese: 山東師範大學; pinyin: Shāndōng Shīfàn Dàxué, English acronym SDNU) is a university in Jinan City, Shandong Province, China. It is one of the earliest institutions of higher learning established in Shandong Province since the founding of the People's Republic of China.

== History ==
Predecessor schools of teachers education in Shandong date back to 1902. The university itself was established in 1950 and was known as Shandong Normal College (山东师范学院) until 1981. The new campus welcomed the first batch of students in 2005. In November 2012, the University was included in the first batch of famous universities with characteristics aiming to cultivate application-oriented talents in Shandong Province. In 2020, SDNU was selected as a high-level university in Shandong Province to build a first-class university.

== Campus and statistics ==
Shandong Normal College has two campuses, which are Qianfoshan Campus and Changqinghu Campus, covering a total area of nearly 3,850 mu (about 2.56 million square meters) and a building area of about 1.35 million square meters. Currently there are more than 34,000 full-time Chinese students and over 200 international students enrolled.

Among the whole staff of 2,831, there are 2,119 full-time teachers, of which 417 teachers are full professors and 878 are associate professors. There are 8 dual academicians, 54 people were selected into the national "10,000 people plan", Changjiang scholars (including youth), national outstanding youth and other national talent projects (projects), of which 22 people were awarded the national honorary title of National Excellent Teachers,96 people enjoy the special government allowances of the State Council. Two teacher teams were awarded the National College Huang Danian Style Teacher Team.

Qilu Culture Research Centre and Elementary Teaching Courses Research Centre at SDNU are the only two key research centers of the humanities established at provincial universities by the Ministry of Education of China (MOE). SDNU publishes six international academic periodicals. Among them is China Population Resources & Environment, which is the only journal focusing on sustainable development in China.

SDNU has also established inter-school exchanges and cooperation with 158 institutions in 32 countries and regions. Since 2011, it regularly employs foreign instructors for special two-week courses in English on issues relating to the web and media through the School of Communications. In 1983 SDNU was approved by the Ministry of Education of China) to recruit international students and receive international China scholarship students. And SDNU is among the HSK exam centers approved by MOE. Since then, over 5,000 international students have graduated from the university.

== Campus Environment ==
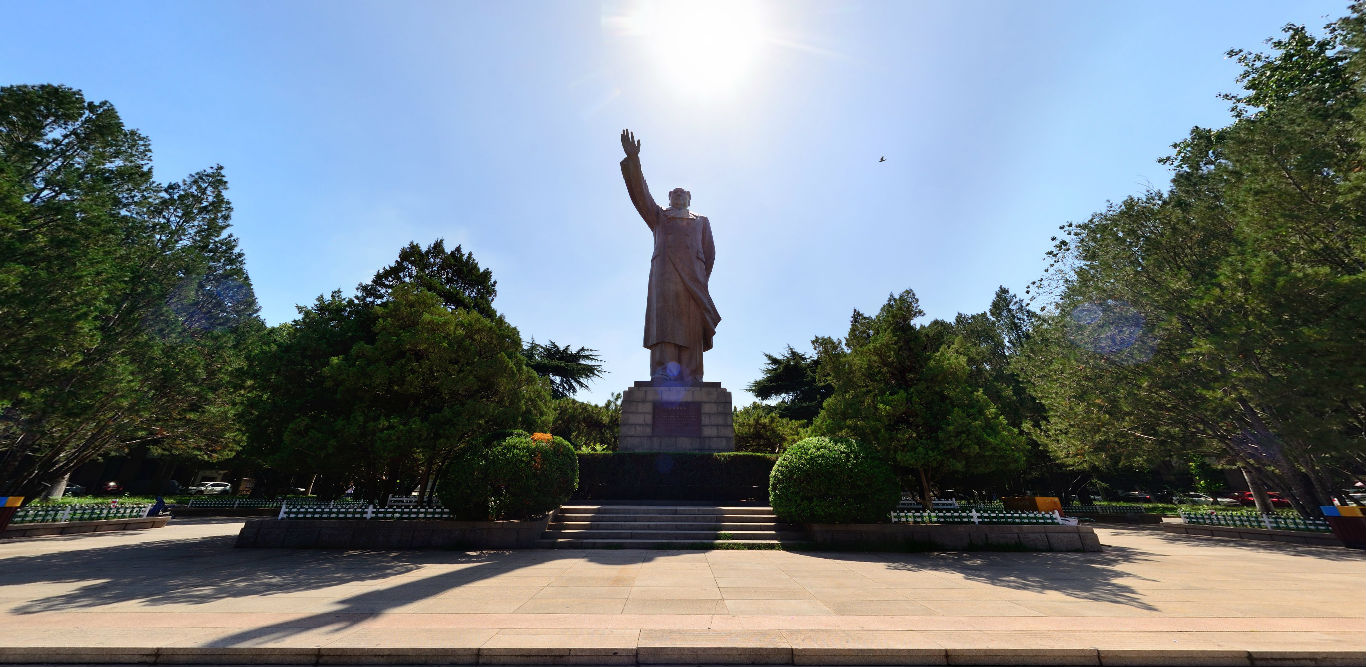
Dongfanghong Square, Qianfoshan Campus, Shandong Normal University

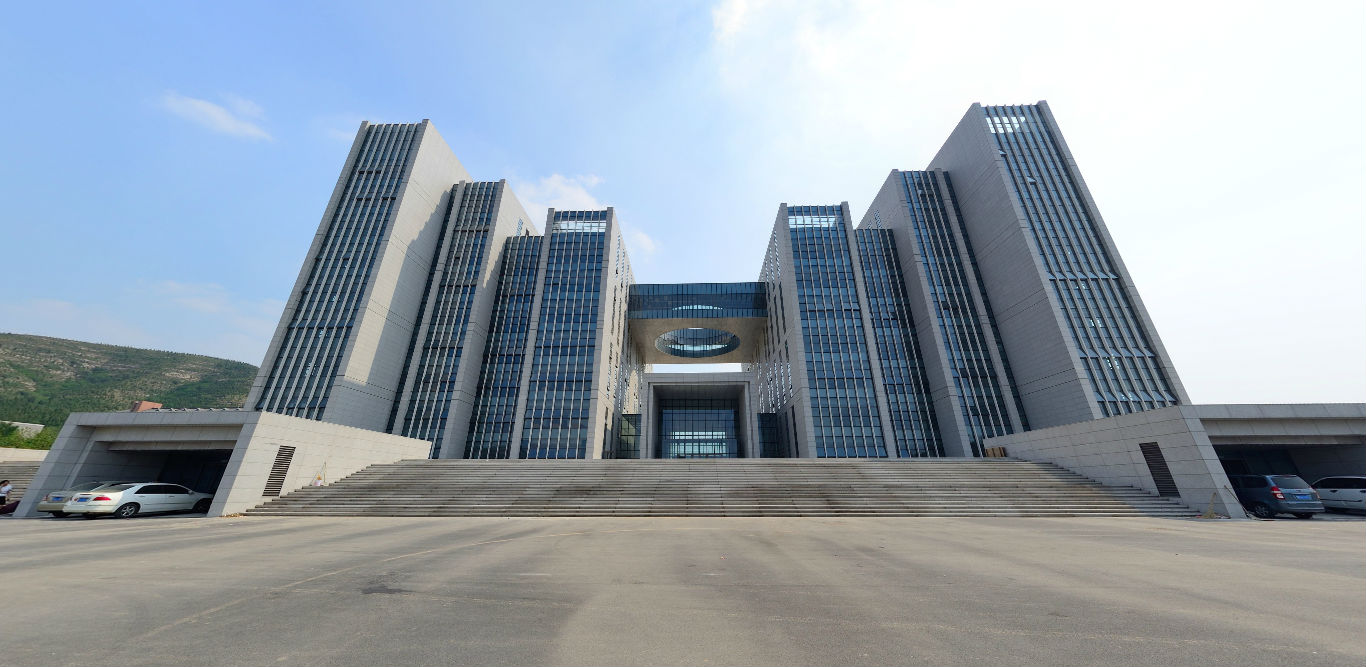
Shandong Normal University Changqing Lake Campus Library

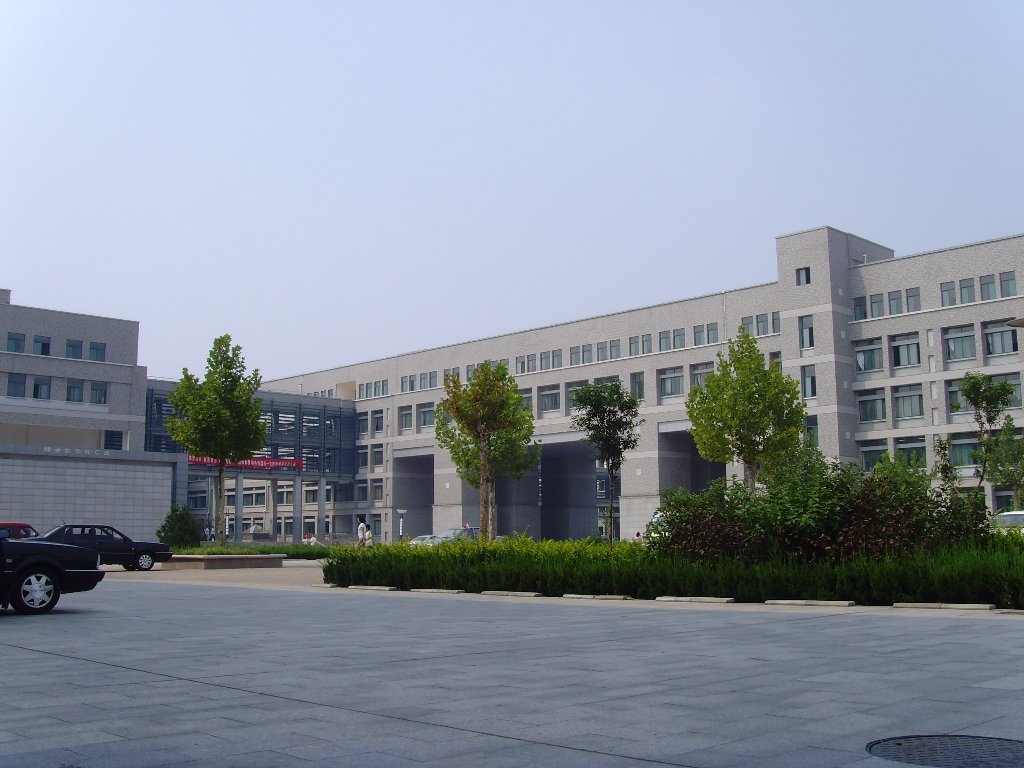
Main Teaching Building, Changqing Lake Campus, Shandong Normal University

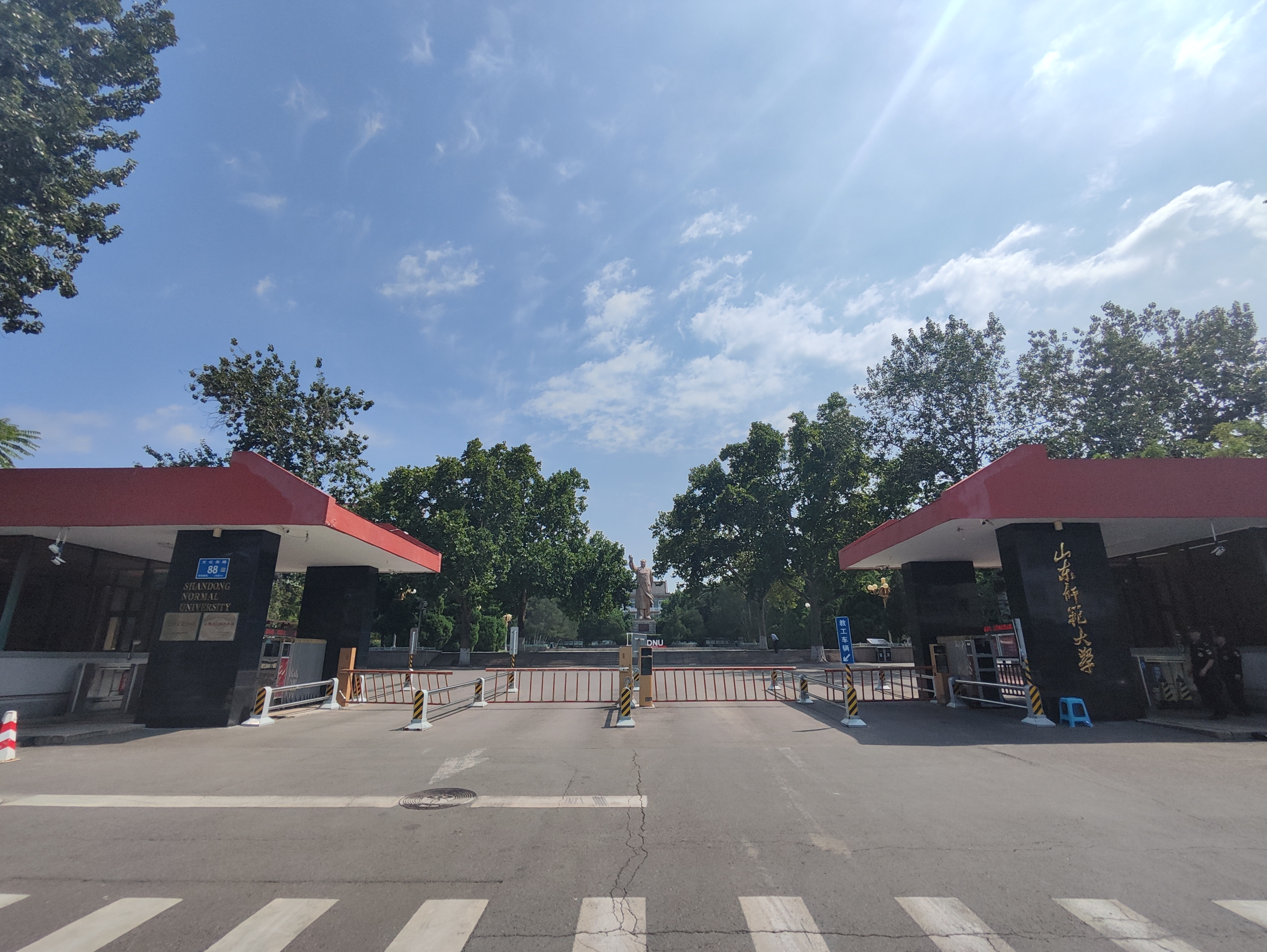
North Gate of Qianfoshan Campus of Shandong Normal University

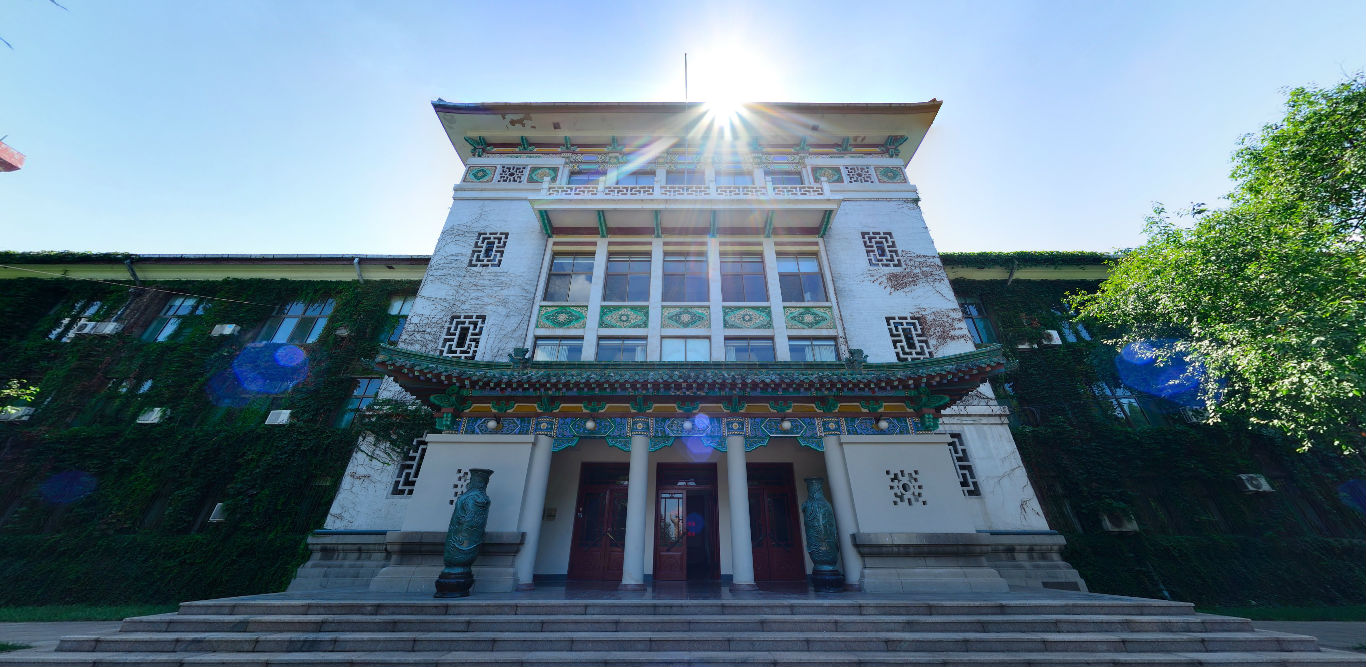
The Culture Building of Cheonboshan Campus built in 1955.

== Notable faculty members ==
- An Zuozhang, historian
- Meigu Guan, mathematician
- Lu Youquan, education theorist

== See also ==
- Attached Senior School of Shandong Normal University
