= Lu Youquan =

Chinese education scholar (1943–2019)

Lu Youquan (Chinese: 陆有铨; April 1943 – 12 November 2019) was a Chinese education scholar. His books on philosophy of education, including Piaget's Theory and Moral Education and One Hundred Years of Restless Movement, won multiple National Education Research Awards and China Book Prizes. He was a professor of education at Shandong Normal University and East China Normal University.

== Biography ==
Lu was born in April 1943 in Xinghua, Jiangsu, Republic of China. He studied at Shanghai Datong High School before testing into the Department of Education of East China Normal University in 1962. After graduating in 1968, he worked at a military farm for a year and then became a teacher at a secondary normal school in Shandong.

After the end of the Cultural Revolution, Lu was accepted by the joint master's program of Shandong Normal University and East China Normal University in 1979, and studied philosophy of education under renowned scholars Fu Tongxian and Zhang Wenyu 张文郁.

Upon graduation, Lu joined the faculty of Shandong Normal University in 1982. He became a full professor in 1988 and a doctoral advisor in 1990, and served as Chair of the Department of Education of Shandong Normal University. In 1998, he transferred to East China Normal University, where he served as a lifetime professor. He also taught as an adjunct professor at more than 10 other universities. He served as President of the Shanghai Institute of Education Science and Editor-in-Chief of the journal Basic Education (基础教育).

Lu died on 12 November 2019 at Renji Hospital Eastern Branch in Shanghai, aged 76.

== Contributions ==
Lu was one of China's foremost researchers on modern Western philosophy of education, including Piaget's theory of cognitive development. He published many award-winning books in the field, including Piaget's Theory and Moral Education (皮亚杰理论与道德教育), which won the inaugural National Education Research Award (First Class); One Hundred Years of Restless Movement: The Course of Development in Education during the 20th Century (躁动的百年), which won the 2nd National Education Research Award (First Class) and the 11th China Book Prize; and Modern Western Philosophy of Education (现代西方教育哲学), which won the Shanghai Philosophy and Social Sciences Research Award (First Class). His 9-book series, Retrospect and Prospect of Education in the 20th Century (20世纪教育回顾与前瞻), won the 10th China Book Prize. He also translated many Western works in education philosophy into Chinese.

He was awarded a special pension for distinguished scholars by the State Council of China in 1991, the Tsang Hin-chi Education Award in 1993, and the Baosteel Excellent Teacher Award in 2000.
