= An Zuozhang =

Chinese historian (1927–2019)

An Zuozhang (Chinese: 安作璋; Wade–Giles: An Tso-chang; 10 January 1927 – 20 February 2019) was a Chinese historian who specialized in ancient Chinese history and the regional history of Shandong. A lifelong professor of Shandong Normal University, he was considered in China as a leading expert in the history of Qin and Han dynasties.

== Biography ==
An was born on 10 January 1927 in Cao County, Shandong, Republic of China. After graduating from the Department of History of Cheeloo University in 1951, he served as a faculty member in the history department of Shandong Normal University until his death. From 1985 to 1989 he also served as director of the university's Research Institute of Ancient Documents.

In 1954, two of his papers, on the military colonies and agricultural officials of the Western Han dynasty, respectively, were published in the influential national newspaper Guangming Daily, a rare feat for a 27-year-old historian.

An published more than 100 academic papers and more than 30 books. A number of them, including A Draft History of Qin and Han Officialdom (秦汉官制史稿), Biography of Liu Bang (刘邦评传), A Cultural History of Canals in China (中国运河文化史), General History of Shandong (山东通史), General Cultural History of Shandong (齐鲁文化通史), and General History of Chinese Acrobatic Art (中华杂技艺术通史), were awarded the Shandong Provincial Social Science Research Prize (First Class).

An was considered in China as a leading expert in the history of the Qin and Han dynasties. In his view, the governing principle of the Western Han (or Xi Han) dynasty was "doing nothing against nature" and ensuring "a peaceful environment to develop the economy". He was recognized by the Government of Shandong as a "top provincial expert", and was awarded a special pension by the State Council of China. He was elected a delegate to the 13th National Congress of the Chinese Communist Party.

On 20 February 2019, An died of a heart attack at the age of 92.
