= Vehicle rescheduling problem =

Transportation and logistics optimization problem

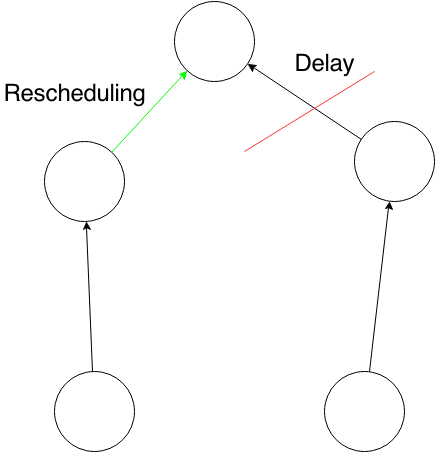
A figure illustrating the vehicle rescheduling problem.

The vehicle rescheduling problem (VRSP) is a combinatorial optimization and integer programming problem seeking to service customers on a trip after change of schedule such as vehicle break down or major delay. Proposed by Li, Mirchandani and Borenstein in 2007, the VRSP is an important problem in the fields of transportation and logistics.

Determining the optimal solution is an NP-complete problem in combinatorial optimization, so in practice heuristic and deterministic methods are used to find acceptably good solutions for the VRSP.

== Overview ==
Several variations and specializations of the vehicle rescheduling problem exist:

- Single Depot Vehicle Rescheduling Problem (SDVRSP): A number of trips need to be rescheduled due to delay, vehicle break down or for any other reason. The goal is to find optimal rescheduling of the existing fleet, using possibly extra vehicles from the depot, in order to minimise the delay and the operating costs. In the Single Depot variation, there is only one depot which contains all extra vehicles, and in which every vehicle starts and ends its schedule.
- Multi Depot Vehicle Rescheduling Problem (MDVRSP): Similar to SDVRSP, except additional depots are introduced. Each depot has capacity constraints, as well as variable extra vehicles. Usually vehicle schedules have an additional constraint which requires that each vehicle returns to the depot where it started its schedule.
- Open Vehicle Rescheduling Problem (OVRSP): Vehicles are not required to return to the depot.

Although VRSP is related to the Single Depot Vehicle Scheduling Problem and the Multi Depot Vehicle Scheduling Problem, there is a significant difference in runtime requirements, as VRSP needs to be solved in near real-time to allow rescheduling during operations, while SDVSP and MDVSP are typically solved using long running linear programming methods.

Another field where VRSP is used is in transportation of goods in order to reschedule the routes when demand substantially changes

== See also ==
- Combinatorial optimization
- Vehicle routing problem
