= Attached Senior School of Shandong Normal University =

High school in Jinan City, China

Coordinates: 36.65843°N 117.03546°E

- Chinese: 山东师范大学附属中学

Information
- Other name: Shangshi Fuzhong
- Former name: Shandong Province Industry and Agricultural Intensive Senior School (1950-1955); Chinese: 山东省工农速成中学
- Established: 1950; 76 years ago
- Affiliation: Shandong Normal University

The Attached Senior School of Shandong Normal University (Chinese: 山东师范大学附属中学; pinyin: Shāndōng Shīfàn Dàxué Fùshǔ Zhōngxué), or simply Shangshi Fuzhong is a high school in Jinan City, Shandong Province, China.

The school was founded in 1950 as Shandong Province Industry and Agricultural Intensive Senior School (山东省工农速成中学) and in 1955 became the Attached Senior School of Shandong Normal College (which later became Shandong Normal University).

The School is a normalized key high school (规范化重点高中) in Shandong Province.

== Notable alumni ==
- Wei Dongyi, a mathematician
