= Marine Corps Planning Process =

Military planning method

Marine Corps Planning Process is the primary planning process used by the United States Marine Corps at all levels. Its successful execution is widely regarded as essential for mission success. This planning process involves six steps: Problem Framing, Course of Action (COA) Development, COA Wargaming, COA Comparison and Decision, Orders Development, and Transition.

The planning process has been used by Marine Corps forces at all echelons of command to conduct a range of military operations. The planning associated with these diverse operations has demonstrated the fundamental soundness of the process.

The Marine Corps Planning Process is a six-step process comprising problem framing, course of action (COA) development, COA wargaming, COA comparison and decision, orders development, and transition. The Marine Corps often operates in a joint environment, where the MCPP is the vehicle through which commanders and their staffs in the operating forces provide input to the joint planning process. If time does not allow use of the full, six-step MCPP, the commander and the planners may use the rapid response planning process (R2P2), which is a time-constrained version of the MCPP. The R2P2 enables the Marine expeditionary unit (MEU) to plan and begin execution of certain tasks within six hours and is highly dependent on the use of standard operating procedures (SOPs).
