= Shandong Jianzhu University =

University in Jinan, China

Coordinates: 36°40′36″N 117°10′45″E

- 山东建筑大学
- Type: Public
- Established: 1956
- Academic staff: 1,997
- Students: 26,000
- Location: Jinan, Shandong, China
- Website: http://www.sdjzu.edu.cn/index.php

Shandong Jianzhu University (simplified Chinese: 山东建筑大学; traditional Chinese: 山東建築大學), also translated as Shandong University of Architecture and Engineering, is a public university in Jinan, Shandong province, China. Founded in 1956 as the Jinan Construction and Engineering School, over time it evolved into a full university. Since 1998, it has the right to offer Master-degree studies. Since 2012, it has the right to offer Doctoral-degree.

== Administration ==
=== Faculties ===
- School of Civil Engineering
- Management Engineering
- Thermal Energy Engineering
- School of Municipal and Environmental Engineering
- Building Planning Institute
- Institute of Electrical and Mechanical Engineering
- School of Materials Science and Engineering
- College of Information and Electrical Engineering
- Adult Education College
- College of Arts
- School of Business
- School of Computer Science and Technology
- College of Science
- College of Law and Politics
- College of Foreign Languages
- Department of Physical Education
