= Order statistic tree =

Augmented binary search tree

In computer science, an order statistic tree is a variant of the binary search tree (or more generally, a B-tree) that supports two additional operations beyond insertion, lookup and deletion:

- Select(i) – find the i-th smallest element stored in the tree
- Rank(x) – find the rank of element x in the tree, i.e. its index in the sorted list of elements of the tree

Both operations can be performed in O(log n) worst case time when a self-balancing tree is used as the base data structure.

== Augmented search tree implementation ==
To turn a regular search tree into an order statistic tree, the nodes of the tree need to store one additional value, which is the size of the subtree rooted at that node (i.e., the number of nodes below it). All operations that modify the tree must adjust this information to preserve the invariant that

size[x] = size[left[x]] + size[right[x]] + 1

where size[nil] = 0 by definition. Select can then be implemented as

function Select(t, i)
    // Returns the i'th element (one-indexed) of the elements in t
    p ← size[left[t]]+1
    if i = p
        return t
    else if i < p
        return Select(left[t], i)
    else
        return Select(right[t], i - p)

Rank can be implemented, using the parent-function p[x], as

function Rank(T, x)
    // Returns the position of x (one-indexed) in the linear sorted list of elements of the tree T
    r ← size[left[x]] + 1
    y ← x
    while y ≠ T.root
        if y = right[p[y]]
            r ← r + size[left[p[y]]] + 1
        y ← p[y]
    return r

Order-statistic trees can be further amended with bookkeeping information to maintain balance (e.g., tree height can be added to get an order statistic AVL tree, or a color bit to get a red–black order statistic tree). Alternatively, the size field can be used in conjunction with a weight-balancing scheme at no additional storage cost.

== See also ==
- Implicit treap
- Segment tree can be used for counting queries, and rank is a counting query, as if each node stores 1 and they are summed from beginning to element
