= Join-based tree algorithms =

In computer science, join-based tree algorithms are a class of algorithms for self-balancing binary search trees. This framework aims at designing highly-parallelized algorithms for various balanced binary search trees. The algorithmic framework is based on a single operation join. Under this framework, the join operation captures all balancing criteria of different balancing schemes, and all other functions join have generic implementation across different balancing schemes. The join-based algorithms can be applied to at least four balancing schemes: AVL trees, red–black trees, weight-balanced trees and treaps.

The join$(L,k,R)$ operation takes as input two binary balanced trees $L$ and $R$ of the same balancing scheme, and a key $k$, and outputs a new balanced binary tree $t$ whose in-order traversal is the in-order traversal of $L$, then $k$ then the in-order traversal of $R$. In particular, if the trees are search trees, which means that the in-order of the trees maintain a total ordering on keys, it must satisfy the condition that all keys in $L$ are smaller than $k$ and all keys in $R$ are greater than $k$.

== History ==
The join operation was first defined by Tarjan on red–black trees, which runs in worst-case logarithmic time. Later Sleator and Tarjan described a join algorithm for splay trees which runs in amortized logarithmic time. Later Adams extended join to weight-balanced trees and used it for fast set–set functions including union, intersection and set difference. In 1998, Blelloch and Reid-Miller extended join on treaps, and proved the bound of the set functions to be $O(m\log (1+\tfrac{n}{m}))$ for two trees of size $m$ and $n(\ge m)$, which is optimal in the comparison model. They also brought up parallelism in Adams' algorithm by using a divide-and-conquer scheme. In 2016, Blelloch et al. formally proposed the join-based algorithms, and formalized the join algorithm for four different balancing schemes: AVL trees, red–black trees, weight-balanced trees and treaps. In the same work they proved that Adams' algorithms on union, intersection and difference are work-optimal on all the four balancing schemes.

== Join algorithms ==
The function join$(t_1,k,t_2)$ considers rebalancing the tree, and thus depends on the input balancing scheme. If the two trees are balanced, join simply creates a new node with left subtree t_{1}, root k and right subtree t_{2}. Suppose that t_{1} is heavier (this "heavier" depends on the balancing scheme) than t_{2} (the other case is symmetric). Join follows the right spine of t_{1} until a node c which is balanced with t_{2}. At this point a new node with left child c, root k and right child t_{2} is created to replace c. The new node may invalidate the balancing invariant. This can be fixed with rotations.

The following is the join algorithms on different balancing schemes.

The join algorithm for AVL trees:

function joinRightAVL(TL, k, TR)
    (l, k', c) := expose(TL)
    if h(c) ≤ h(TR) + 1
        T' := Node(c, k, TR)
        if h(T') ≤ h(l) + 1
            return Node(l, k', T')
        else
            return rotateLeft(Node(l, k', rotateRight(T')))
    else 
        T' := joinRightAVL(c, k, TR)
        T := Node(l, k', T')
        if h(T') ≤ h(l) + 1
            return T
        else
            return rotateLeft(T)

function joinLeftAVL(TL, k, TR)
    /* symmetric to joinRightAVL */

function join(TL, k, TR)
    if h(TL) > h(TR) + 1
        return joinRightAVL(TL, k, TR)
    else if h(TR) > h(TL) + 1
        return joinLeftAVL(TL, k, TR)
    else
        return Node(TL, k, TR)

Where:

- $h(v)$ is the height of node $v$.
- $\text{expose}(v)$ extracts the left child $l$, key $k$, and right child $r$ of node $v$ into a tuple $(l,k,r)$.
- $\text{Node}(l,k,r)$ creates a node with left child $l$, key $k$, and right child $r$.

The join algorithm for red–black trees:

function joinRightRB(TL, k, TR)
    if TL.color = black and ĥ(TL) = ĥ(TR)
        return Node(TL, ⟨k, red⟩, TR)
    else 
        (L', ⟨k', c'⟩, R') := expose(TL)
        T' := Node(L', ⟨k', c'⟩, joinRightRB(R', k, TR))
        if c' = black and T'.right.color = T'.right.right.color = red
            T'.right.right.color := black
            return rotateLeft(T')
        else
            return T'

function joinLeftRB(TL, k, TR)
    /* symmetric to joinRightRB */

function join(TL, k, TR)
    if ĥ(TL) > ĥ(TR)
        T' := joinRightRB(TL, k, TR)
        if (T'.color = red) and (T'.right.color = red)
            T'.color := black
        return T'
    else if ĥ(TR) > ĥ(TL)
        /* symmetric */
    else if TL.color = black and TR = black
        return Node(TL, ⟨k, red⟩, TR)
    else
        return Node(TL, ⟨k, black⟩, TR)

Where:

- $\hat{h}(v)$ is the black height of node $v$.
- $\text{expose}(v)$ extracts the left child $l$, key $k$, color $c$, and right child $r$ of node $v$ into a tuple $(l, \langle k, c \rangle, r)$.
- $\text{Node}(l, \langle k, c\rangle, r)$ creates a node with left child $l$, key $k$, color $c$, and right child $r$.

The join algorithm for weight-balanced trees:

function joinRightWB(TL, k, TR)
    (l, k', c) := expose(TL)
    if w(TL) =α w(TR)
        return Node(TL, k, TR)
    else 
        T' := joinRightWB(c, k, TR)
        (l1, k1, r1) := expose(T')
        if w(l) =α w(T')
            return Node(l, k', T')
        else if w(l) =α w(l1) and w(l)+w(l1) =α w(r1)
            return rotateLeft(Node(l, k', T'))
        else
            return rotateLeft(Node(l, k', rotateRight(T'))

function joinLeftWB(TL, k, TR)
    /* symmetric to joinRightWB */

function join(TL, k, TR)
    if w(TL) >α w(TR)
        return joinRightWB(TL, k, TR)
    else if w(TR) >α w(TL)
        return joinLeftWB(TL, k, TR)
    else
        return Node(TL, k, TR)

Where:

- $w(v)$ is the weight of node $v$.
- $w_1 =_\alpha w_2$ means weights $w_1$ and $w_2$ are α-weight-balanced.
- $w_1 >_\alpha w_2$ means weight $w_1$ is heavier than weight $w_2$ with respect to the α-weight-balance.
- $\text{expose}(v)$ extracts the left child $l$, key $k$, and right child $r$ of node $v$ into a tuple $(l,k,r)$.
- $\text{Node}(l,k,r)$ creates a node with left child $l$, key $k$ and right child $r$.

== Join-based algorithms ==
In the following, $\text{expose}(v)$ extracts the left child $l$, key $k$, and right child $r$ of node $v$ into a tuple $(l,k,r)$. $\text{Node}(l,k,r)$ creates a node with left child $l$, key $k$ and right child $r$. "$s_1 || s_2$" means that two statements $s_1$ and $s_2$ can run in parallel.

=== Split ===
To split a tree into two trees, those smaller than key x, and those larger than key x, we first draw a path from the root by inserting x into the tree. After this insertion, all values less than x will be found on the left of the path, and all values greater than x will be found on the right. By applying Join, all the subtrees on the left side are merged bottom-up using keys on the path as intermediate nodes from bottom to top to form the left tree, and the right part is asymmetric. For some applications, Split also returns a boolean value denoting if x appears in the tree. The cost of Split is $O(\log n)$, order of the height of the tree.

The split algorithm is as follows:

function split(T, k)
    if (T = nil)
        return (nil, false, nil)
    else
        (L, m, R) := expose(T)
        if k < m
            (L', b, R') := split(L, k)
            return (L', b, join(R', m, R))
        else if k > m
            (L', b, R') := split(R, k)
            return (join(L, m, L'), b, R'))
        else
            return (L, true, R)

=== Join2 ===
This function is defined similarly as join but without the middle key. It first splits out the last key $k$ of the left tree, and then join the rest part of the left tree with the right tree with $k$. The algorithm is as follows:

function splitLast(T)
    (L, k, R) := expose(T)
    if R = nil
        return (L, k)
    else
        (T', k') := splitLast(R)
        return (join(L, k, T'), k')

function join2(L, R)
    if L = nil
        return R
    else
        (L', k) := splitLast(L)
        return join(L', k, R)

The cost is $O(\log n)$ for a tree of size $n$.

=== Insert and delete ===
The insertion and deletion algorithms, when making use of join can be independent of balancing schemes. For an insertion, the algorithm compares the key to be inserted with the key in the root, inserts it to the left/right subtree if the key is smaller/greater than the key in the root, and joins the two subtrees back with the root. A deletion compares the key to be deleted with the key in the root. If they are equal, return join2 on the two subtrees. Otherwise, delete the key from the corresponding subtree, and join the two subtrees back with the root. The algorithms are as follows:

function insert(T, k)
    if T = nil
        return Node(nil, k, nil)
    else
        (L, k', R) := expose(T)
        if k < k'
            return join(insert(L,k), k', R)
        else if k > k'
            return join(L, k', insert(R, k))
        else
            return T

function delete(T, k)
    if T = nil
        return nil
    else
        (L, k', R) := expose(T)
        if k < k'
            return join(delete(L, k), k', R)
        else if k > k'
            return join(L, k', delete(R, k))
        else
            return join2(L, R)

Both insertion and deletion requires $O(\log n)$ time if $|T|=n$.

=== Set–set functions ===
Several set operations have been defined on weight-balanced trees: union, intersection and set difference. The union of two weight-balanced trees t_{1} and t_{2} representing sets A and B, is a tree t that represents A ∪ B. The following recursive function computes this union:

function union(t1, t2)
    if t1 = nil
        return t2
    else if t2 = nil
        return t1
    else
        (l1, k1, r1) := expose(t1)
        (t<, b, t>) := split(t2, k1)
        l' := union(l1, t<) || r' := union(r1, t>)
        return join(l', k1, r')

Similarly, the algorithms of intersection and set-difference are as follows:

function intersection(t1, t2)
    if t1 = nil or t2 = nil
        return nil
    else
        (l1, k1, r1) := expose(t1)
        (t<, b, t>) = split(t2, k1)
        l' := intersection(l1, t<) || r' := intersection(r1, t>)
        if b
            return join(l', k1, r')
        else
            return join2(l', r')

function difference(t1, t2)
    if t1 = nil
         return nil
    else if t2 = nil
         return t1
    else
        (l1, k1, r1) := expose(t1)
        (t<, b, t>) := split(t2, k1)
        l' = difference(l1, t<) || r' = difference(r1, t>)
        if b
            return join2(l', r')
        else
            return join(l', k1, r')

The complexity of each of union, intersection and difference is $O\left(m \log \left(\tfrac{n}{m}+1\right)\right)$ for two weight-balanced trees of sizes $m$ and $n(\ge m)$. This complexity is optimal in terms of the number of comparisons. More importantly, since the recursive calls to union, intersection or difference are independent of each other, they can be executed in parallel with a parallel depth $O(\log m\log n)$. When $m=1$, the join-based implementation applies the same computation as in a single-element insertion or deletion if the root of the larger tree is used to split the smaller tree.

=== Build ===
The algorithm for building a tree can make use of the union algorithm, and use the divide-and-conquer scheme:

function build(A[], n)
    if n = 0
        return nil
    else if n = 1
        return Node(nil, A[0], nil)
    else
        l' := build(A, n/2) || r' := (A+n/2, n-n/2)
        return union(L, R)

This algorithm costs $O(n\log n)$ work and has $O(\log^3 n)$ depth. A more-efficient algorithm makes use of a parallel sorting algorithm.

function buildSorted(A[], n)
    if n = 0
        return nil
    else if n = 1
        return Node(nil, A[0], nil)
    else
        l' := build(A, n/2) || r' := (A+n/2+1, n-n/2-1)
        return join(l', A[n/2], r')

function build(A[], n)
    A' := sort(A, n)
    return buildSorted(A, n)

This algorithm costs $O(n\log n)$ work and has $O(\log n)$ depth assuming the sorting algorithm has $O(n\log n)$ work and $O(\log n)$ depth.

=== Filter ===
This function selects all entries in a tree satisfying a predicate $p$, and return a tree containing all selected entries. It recursively filters the two subtrees, and join them with the root if the root satisfies $p$, otherwise join2 the two subtrees.

function filter(T, p)
    if T = nil
        return nil
    else
        (l, k, r) := expose(T)
        l' := filter(l, p) || r' := filter(r, p)
        if p(k)
            return join(l', k, r')
        else
            return join2(l', R)

This algorithm costs work $O(n)$ and depth $O(\log^2 n)$ on a tree of size $n$, assuming $p$ has constant cost.

== Used in libraries ==
The join-based algorithms are applied to support interface for sets, maps, and augmented maps in libraries such as Hackage, SML/NJ, and PAM.
