= RBST =

RBST or rBST may refer to:

- Randomized binary search tree, a computer data structure
- Rare Breeds Survival Trust, a UK charity
- Recombinant bovine somatotropin (usually "rBST"), a synthetic growth hormone controversially used in dairy farming
