= TreapDB =

Kind of NoSQL data store based on the Treap data structure

- Stable release: 1.1 / December 3, 2010
- Written in: Java
- Operating system: Cross-platform
- Type: key-value store
- License: Apache License 2.0
- Website: code.google.com/p/treapdb/

TreapDB is a kind of NoSQL data store, and it is based on Treap data structure. Treap is a randomized balanced search tree, which has O(log(n)) complexity to insert or find a key. TreapDB supports many operations besides "get" and "set". For example, "prefix foo" fetch all the pairs whose key startswith "foo". TreapDB can be used in two ways: embedded library or standalone server.

TreapDB is sponsored by Sino-German Joint Laboratory of Software Integration.
