= Andrew Colin =

British computer science professor

Andrew Colin lecturing at Strathclyde University in 1982

Andrew John Theodore Colin was a British university professor of computer science, born in 1936. He is a co-inventor of the widely used Binary Tree data structure. Professor Colin published 12 textbooks on various aspects of Computer Science, some of which have been translated into other languages.

Andrew Colin lectured at Birkbeck College, University of London from 1957 to 1960, moving in 1960 to the university's Institute of Computer Science. From 1965 to 1970 he was Director of the Computer Science Laboratory at Lancaster University. In 1970 he was appointed Professor in the newly created Department of Computer Science at the University of Strathclyde. He stepped down as head of department in 1983 and started a company working on developing commercial applications based on the Department's research, while continuing to teach. Subsequently, he lectured part-time at the Graduate School of Business. He also sang bass in the choir of St. Mary's Cathedral, Glasgow.

He died on 25 September 2018 at the age of 82.
