= With high probability =

Description of limiting behavior in probabilistic algorithms

In mathematics, an event that occurs with high probability (often shortened to w.h.p. or WHP) is one whose probability depends on a certain number n and goes to 1 as n goes to infinity, i.e. the probability of the event occurring can be made as close to 1 as desired by making n big enough.

== Applications ==
The term WHP is especially common in computer science, in the analysis of probabilistic algorithms. For example, consider a certain probabilistic algorithm on a graph with n nodes. If the probability that the algorithm returns the correct answer is $1-1/n$, then when the number of nodes is very large, the algorithm is correct with a probability that is very near 1. This fact is expressed shortly by saying that the algorithm is correct WHP.

Some examples where this term is used are:

- Miller–Rabin primality test: a probabilistic algorithm for testing whether a given number n is prime or composite. If n is composite, the test will detect n as composite WHP. There is a small chance that we are unlucky and the test will think that n is prime. But, the probability of error can be reduced indefinitely by running the test many times with different randomizations.
- Freivalds' algorithm: a randomized algorithm for verifying matrix multiplication. It runs faster than deterministic algorithms WHP.
- Treap: a randomized binary search tree. Its height is logarithmic WHP. Fusion tree is a related data structure.
- Online codes: randomized codes which allow the user to recover the original message WHP.
- BQP: a complexity class of problems for which there are polynomial-time quantum algorithms which are correct WHP.
- Probably approximately correct learning: A process for machine-learning in which the learned function has low generalization-error WHP.
- Gossip protocols: a communication protocol used in distributed systems to reliably deliver messages to the whole cluster using a constant amount of network resources on each node and ensuring no single point of failure.

== See also ==
- Randomized algorithm
- Almost surely
