= Point location =

Family of problems in computational geometry

The point location class of problems is a fundamental topic of computational geometry. It finds applications in areas that deal with processing geometrical data: computer graphics, geographic information systems (GIS), motion planning, and computer aided design (CAD).

In one of its general forms, the problem is, given a partition of the space into disjoint regions, to determine the region where a query point lies. For example, the problem of determining which window of a graphical user interface contains a given mouse click can be formulated as an instance of point location, with a subdivision formed by the visible parts of each window, although specialized data structures may be more appropriate than general-purpose point location data structures in this application. A special case is the point in polygon problem, in which one needs to determine whether a point is inside, outside, or on the boundary of a single polygon. Other special cases exist.

The problem may be stated for a set of arbitrary regions in space, not necessarily disjoint and not necessarily constituting a partition.

Further, one may need to determine the location of several points with respect to the same partition of the space. Or, alternatively, partitions may be changing. In the latter case the class of problems overlaps with range search problems. To solve the problems with varying queries or regions efficiently, it is useful to build a data structure that, given a query point, quickly determines which region contains the query point (e.g. the Voronoi diagram).

== Location in a subdivision ==
=== Planar case ===
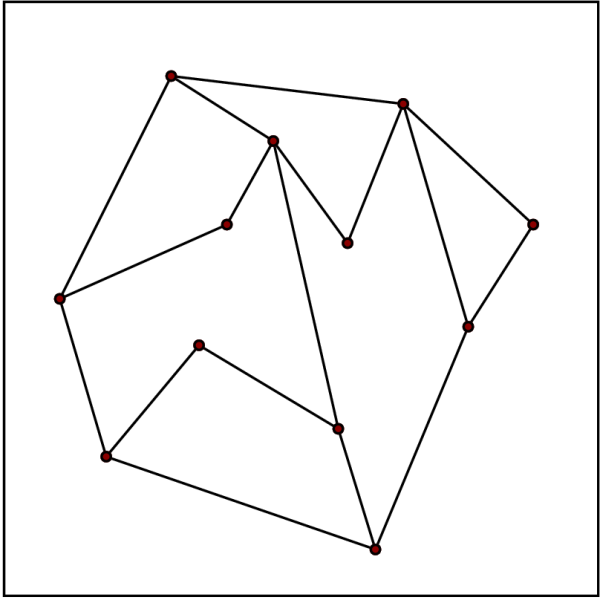
A planar subdivision inside a bounding box

In the planar case, we are given a planar subdivision S, formed by multiple polygons called faces, and need to determine which face contains a query point. A brute force search of each face using the point-in-polygon algorithm is possible, but usually not feasible for subdivisions of high complexity. Several different approaches lead to optimal data structures, with O(n) storage space and O(log n) query time, where n is the total number of vertices in S. For simplicity, we assume that the planar subdivision is contained inside a square bounding box.

==== Slab decomposition ====
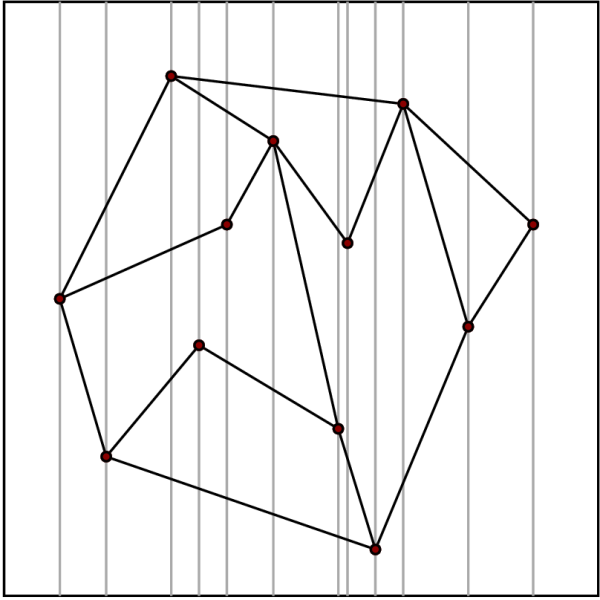
A planar subdivision divided into slabs.

The simplest and earliest data structure to achieve O(log n) time was discovered by Dobkin and Lipton in 1976. It is based on subdividing S using vertical lines that pass through each vertex in S. The region between two consecutive vertical lines is called a slab. Notice that each slab is divided by non-intersecting line segments that completely cross the slab from left to right. The region between two consecutive segments inside a slab corresponds to a unique face of S. Therefore, we reduce our point location problem to two simpler problems:

1. Given a subdivision of the plane into vertical slabs, determine which slab contains a given point.
2. Given a slab subdivided into regions by non-intersecting segments that completely cross the slab from left to right, determine which region contains a given point.

The first problem can be solved by binary search on the x coordinate of the vertical lines in O(log n) time. The second problem can also be solved in O(log n) time by binary search. To see how, notice that, as the segments do not intersect and completely cross the slab, the segments can be sorted vertically inside each slab. While this algorithm allows point location in logarithmic time and is easy to implement, the space required to build the slabs and the regions contained within the slabs can be as high as O(n²), since each slab can cross a significant fraction of the segments.

Several authors noticed that the segments that cross two adjacent slabs are mostly the same. Therefore, the size of the data structure can be significantly reduced. More specifically, Sarnak and Tarjan sweep a vertical line l from left to right over the plane, while maintaining the segments that intersect l in a Persistent red-black tree. This allows them to reduce the storage space to O(n), while maintaining the O(log n) query time.

==== Monotone subdivisions ====
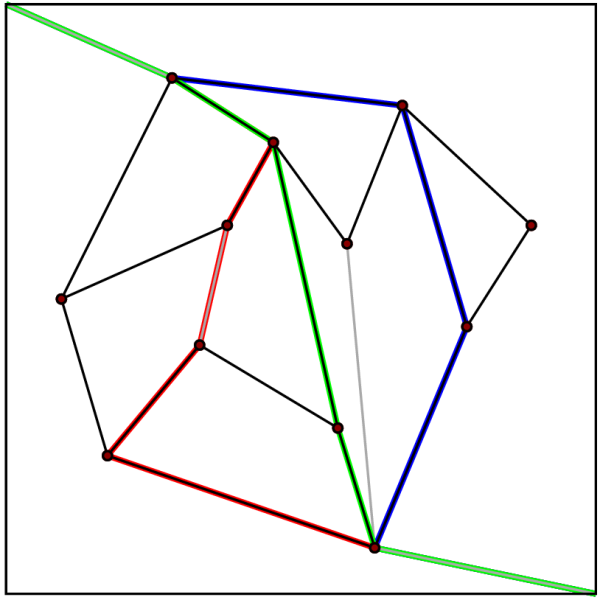
A monotone planar subdivision with some monotone chains highlighted.

A (vertical) monotone chain is a path such that the y-coordinate never increases along the path. A simple polygon is (vertical) monotone if it is formed by two monotone chains, with the first and last vertices in common. It is possible to add some edges to a planar subdivision, in order to make all faces monotone, obtaining what is called a monotone subdivision. This process does not add any vertices to the subdivision (therefore, the size remains O(n)), and can be performed in O(n log n) time by plane sweep (it can also be performed in linear time, using polygon triangulation). Therefore, there is no loss of generality, if we restrict our data structure to the case of monotone subdivisions, as we do in this section.

The weakness of the slab decomposition is that the vertical lines create additional segments in the decomposition, making it difficult to achieve O(n) storage space. Herbert Edelsbrunner, Leonidas J. Guibas, and Jorge Stolfi discovered an optimal data structure that only uses the edges in a monotone subdivision. The idea is to use vertical monotone chains, instead of using vertical lines to partition the subdivision.

Converting this general idea to an actual efficient data structure is not a simple task. First, we need to be able to compute a monotone chain that divides the subdivision into two halves of similar sizes. Second, since some edges may be contained in several monotone chains, we need to be careful to guarantee that the storage space is O(n). Third, testing whether a point is on the left or the right side of a monotone subdivision takes O(n) time if performed naïvely.

Details on how to solve the first two issues are beyond the scope of this article. We briefly mention how to address the third issue. Using binary search, we can test whether a point is to the left or right of a monotone chain in O(log n) time. As we need to perform another nested binary search through O(log n) chains to actually determine the point location, the query time is O(log² n). To achieve O(log n) query time, we need to use fractional cascading, keeping pointers between the edges of different monotone chains.

==== Triangulation refinement ====
Successive steps of triangulation refinement.

A polygon with m vertices can be partitioned into m–2 triangles. Which can be shown by induction starting from a triangle. There are numerous algorithms to triangulate a polygon efficiently, the fastest having O(n) worst case time. Therefore, we can decompose each polygon of our subdivision in triangles, and restrict our data structure to the case of subdivisions formed exclusively by triangles. Kirkpatrick gives a data structure for point location in triangulated subdivisions with O(n) storage space and O(log n) query time.

The general idea is to build a hierarchy of triangles. To perform a query, we start by finding the top-level triangle that contains the query point. Since the number of top-level triangles is bounded by a constant, this operation can be performed in O(1) time. Each triangle has pointers to the triangles it intersects in the next level of the hierarchy, and the number of pointers is also bounded by a constant. We proceed with the query by finding which triangle contains the query point level by level.

The data structure is built in the opposite order, that is, bottom-up. We start with the triangulated subdivision, and choose an independent set of vertices to be removed. After removing the vertices, we retriangulate the subdivision. Because the subdivision is formed by triangles, a greedy algorithm can find an independent set that contains a constant fraction of the vertices. Therefore, the number of removal steps is O(log n).

==== Trapezoidal decomposition ====
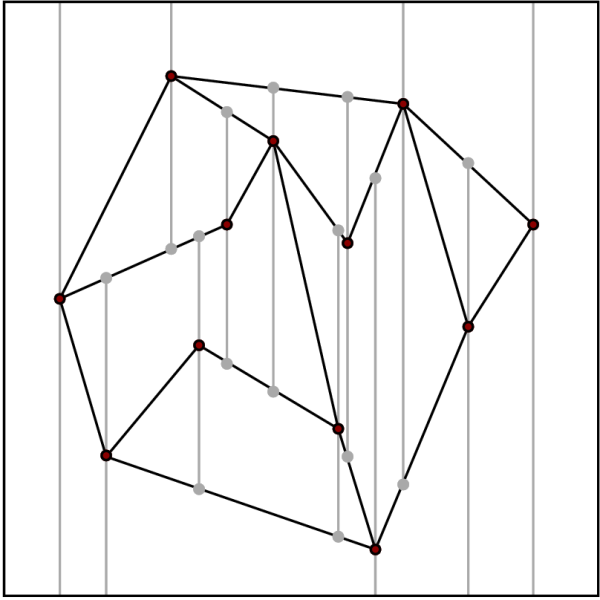
A trapezoidal decomposition.

A randomized approach to this problem is based on trapezoidal decomposition, or trapezoidal map. A trapezoidal decomposition is obtained by shooting vertical bullets going both up and down from each vertex in the original subdivision. The bullets stop when they hit an edge, and form a new edge in the subdivision. This way, we obtain a subset of the slab decomposition, with only O(n) edges and vertices, since for each vertex in the original subdivision we only add two new vertices and increase the number of edges by four.

A trapezoidal decomposition can be constructed by adding the segments from the original subdivision, one by one, in a random order. Initially (before no segments have been added) the trapezoidal decomposition consists of a single trapezoid, the bounding box of the subdivision. Each subsequent step uses a point location query to locate one endpoint of the next line segment, within the current trapezoidal decomposition, and then walks from the resulting trapezoid to neighboring trapezoids containing the same segment, subdividing and recombining them to form the refined decomposition. Backwards analysis, a form of analysis commonly used for this sort of randomized incremental geometry algorithm, shows that the expected number of trapezoids created for each insertion is bounded by a constant, and therefore that the total number of steps of this algorithm, outside of the point locations, is linear.

The point locations in the current subdivision, performed within this algorithm, may be done using the same structure that, at the end of the algorithm, can be used for point location queries in the final trapezoidal decomposition. This point location data structure takes the form of a directed acyclic graph, where the vertices are the trapezoids that existed at some point in the refinement, and directed edges connect each trapezoid that is no longer in the refinement to the trapezoids that replaced it. A point location query is performed by following a path in this graph, starting from the initial trapezoid, and at each step choosing the replacement trapezoid that contains the query point, until reaching a trapezoid that has not been replaced. The expected depth of a search in this digraph, starting from any query point, is O(log n). The space for the data structure is proportional to the number of trapezoids created throughout this refinement process, which in expectation is O(n).

=== Higher dimensions ===
There are no known general point location data structures with linear space and logarithmic query time for dimensions greater than 2. Therefore, we need to sacrifice either query time, or storage space, or restrict ourselves to some less general type of subdivision.

In three-dimensional space, it is possible to answer point location queries in O(log² n) using O(n log n) space. The general idea is to maintain several planar point location data structures, corresponding to the intersection of the subdivision with n parallel planes that contain each subdivision vertex. A naive use of this idea would increase the storage space to O(n²). In the same fashion as in the slab decomposition, the similarity between consecutive data structures can be exploited in order to reduce the storage space to O(n log n), but the query time increases to O(log² n).

In d-dimensional space, point location can be solved by recursively projecting the faces into a (d-1)-dimensional space. While the query time is O(log n), the storage space can be as high as $O(n^{2^d})$. The high complexity of the d-dimensional data structures led to the study of special types of subdivision.

One important example is the case of arrangements of hyperplanes. An arrangement of n hyperplanes defines O(n^{d}) cells, but point location can be performed in O(log n) time with O(n^{d}) space by using Chazelle's hierarchical cuttings.

Another special type of subdivision is called rectilinear (or orthogonal) subdivision. In a rectilinear subdivision, all edges are parallel to one of the d orthogonal axis. In this case, point location can be answered in O(log^{d-1} n) time with O(n) space.
