= Leonidas J. Guibas =

Greek-American computer scientist

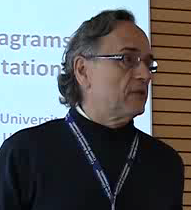
- Leonidas Guibas
- Born: 1949 (age 76–77); Athens, Greece
- Education: California Institute of Technology (BS, MS); Stanford University (PhD)
- Awards: ACM - AAAI Allen Newell Award (2007); ICCV Helmholtz Prize (2013); DoD Vannevar Bush Faculty Fellowship
- Scientific career
- Fields: Computer science, computational geometry, computer vision, computer graphics
- Workplaces: Stanford University
- Doctoral advisor: Donald Knuth
- Doctoral students: Jie Gao

Leonidas John Guibas (Λεωνίδας Γκίμπας; born 1949) is a Greek-American computer scientist and the Paul Pigott Professor of Computer Science (and, by courtesy, Electrical Engineering) at Stanford University, where he heads the Geometric Computation Group. His research spans computational geometry, computer graphics, computer vision, machine learning, and robotics, with contributions including foundational data structures, the earth mover's distance for image retrieval, Metropolis light transport, and the PointNet architecture for deep learning on point clouds.

Guibas is a member of the National Academy of Sciences, the National Academy of Engineering, and the American Academy of Arts and Sciences, and a Fellow of the ACM and the IEEE.

== Education ==
Guibas was born and grew up in Athens, Greece. He received his B.S. and M.S. in mathematics from the California Institute of Technology in 1971, and his Ph.D. in computer science from Stanford University in 1976 under the supervision of Donald Knuth.

== Career ==
After completing his doctorate, Guibas worked at Xerox PARC, DEC SRC, and MIT before joining the Stanford faculty in 1984. He has also served as acting director of the Stanford Artificial Intelligence Laboratory. He was program chair for the ACM Symposium on Computational Geometry in 1996.

== Research ==
=== Algorithms and data structures ===
Guibas's early work contributed several widely used data structures and algorithms in computational geometry. With Robert Sedgewick, he introduced red–black trees, a form of self-balancing binary search tree. Other contributions from this period include finger trees, fractional cascading, an optimal data structure for point location, the quad-edge data structure for representing planar subdivisions, and the Guibas–Stolfi algorithm for Delaunay triangulation. He also developed kinetic data structures for tracking objects in motion.

=== Computer graphics and vision ===
In computer graphics, Guibas co-authored work on Metropolis light transport, which enabled practical global illumination algorithms for photorealistic rendering. In computer vision, he co-developed the earth mover's distance (EMD) with Yossi Rubner and Carlo Tomasi, a metric for comparing distributions that has been widely adopted in image retrieval and related tasks. The EMD paper received the ICCV Helmholtz Prize in 2013, recognizing work with fundamental impact on computer vision.

=== Deep learning on point clouds and 3D geometry ===
More recently, Guibas's group has been a leader in applying deep learning to irregular geometric data such as point clouds and voxels. With Charles R. Qi, Hao Su, and others, he co-developed PointNet (2017), a neural network architecture that directly consumes raw point clouds for tasks including 3D object classification, part segmentation, and scene semantic parsing, without requiring conversion to voxel grids or image projections. The follow-up PointNet++ introduced hierarchical feature learning that captures local geometric structure at multiple scales. These architectures have been applied to problems in autonomous driving, robotics, and computational fluid dynamics.

His group has also developed methods for functional maps between shapes, 3D object detection in point clouds, shape generation, and deformation-aware 3D model analysis.

== Awards and honors ==
- ACM Fellow (1999)
- ACM - AAAI Allen Newell Award (2007), "for his pioneering contributions in applying algorithms to a wide range of computer science disciplines"
- IEEE Fellow (2012)
- ICCV Helmholtz Prize (2013), for the earth mover's distance paper
- Member, National Academy of Engineering (2017)
- Member, American Academy of Arts and Sciences (2018)
- DoD Vannevar Bush Faculty Fellowship
- Member, National Academy of Sciences (2022)

Guibas has an Erdős number of 2, through collaborations with Boris Aronov, Andrew Odlyzko, János Pach, Richard M. Pollack, Endre Szemerédi, and Frances Yao.
