= Range query (database) =

Database operation

A range query is a common database operation that retrieves all records where some value is between an upper and lower boundary. For example, list all employees with 3 to 5 years' experience. Range queries are unusual because it is not generally known in advance how many entries a range query will return, or if it will return any at all. Many other queries, such as the top ten most senior employees, or the newest employee, can be done more efficiently because there is an upper bound to the number of results they will return. A query that returns exactly one result is sometimes called a singleton.

== Partial match query ==
Match at least one of the requested keys.

- B+ tree
- k-d tree
- R-tree

== See also ==
- Range searching
- DBSCAN
- k-nearest neighbors algorithm
- Nearest neighbor graph
