= Jie Gao =

Chinese-American computer scientist

- Citizenship: China
- Education: University of Science and Technology of China (BSc); Stanford University (PhD)
- Occupations: computer scientist, researcher, academic
- Employer: Rutgers University
- Title: professor

Jie Gao is a Chinese-American computer scientist whose research has applied methods from computational geometry to applied problems including the analysis of sensor networks, robot navigation, and location privacy. She is a professor of computer science at Rutgers University.

== Education and career ==
Gao was a student in the Special Class for the Gifted Young at the University of Science and Technology of China, where she received a bachelor's degree in 1999. She became a student of Leonidas J. Guibas at Stanford University, where she completed her Ph.D. in 2004 with the dissertation Hierarchical Data Structures for Mobile Networks, with the support of an IBM Ph.D. Fellowship.

After postdoctoral research at the California Institute of Technology, she became an assistant professor of computer science at Stony Brook University in 2005. She was promoted to associate professor in 2011 and full professor in 2018. In 2020, she moved to her present position at Rutgers University.
