= Slab (geometry) =

In geometry, a slab is a region between two parallel lines in the Euclidean plane, or between two parallel planes in three-dimensional Euclidean space or between two hyperplanes in higher dimensions.

== Set definition ==
A slab can also be defined as a set of points:
$$\{x \in \mathbb{R}^n \mid \alpha \le n \cdot x \le \beta \},$$
where $n$ is the normal vector of the planes $n \cdot x = \alpha$ and $n \cdot x = \beta$.

Or, if the slab is centered around the origin:
$$\{x \in \mathbb{R}^n \mid |n \cdot x| \le \theta / 2 \},$$
where $\theta = |\alpha - \beta|$ is the thickness of the slab.

== See also ==
- Bounding slab
- Convex polytope
- Half-plane
- Hyperplane
- Prismatoid
- Slab decomposition
- Spherical shell
