= Faith Ellen =

Canadian computer scientist

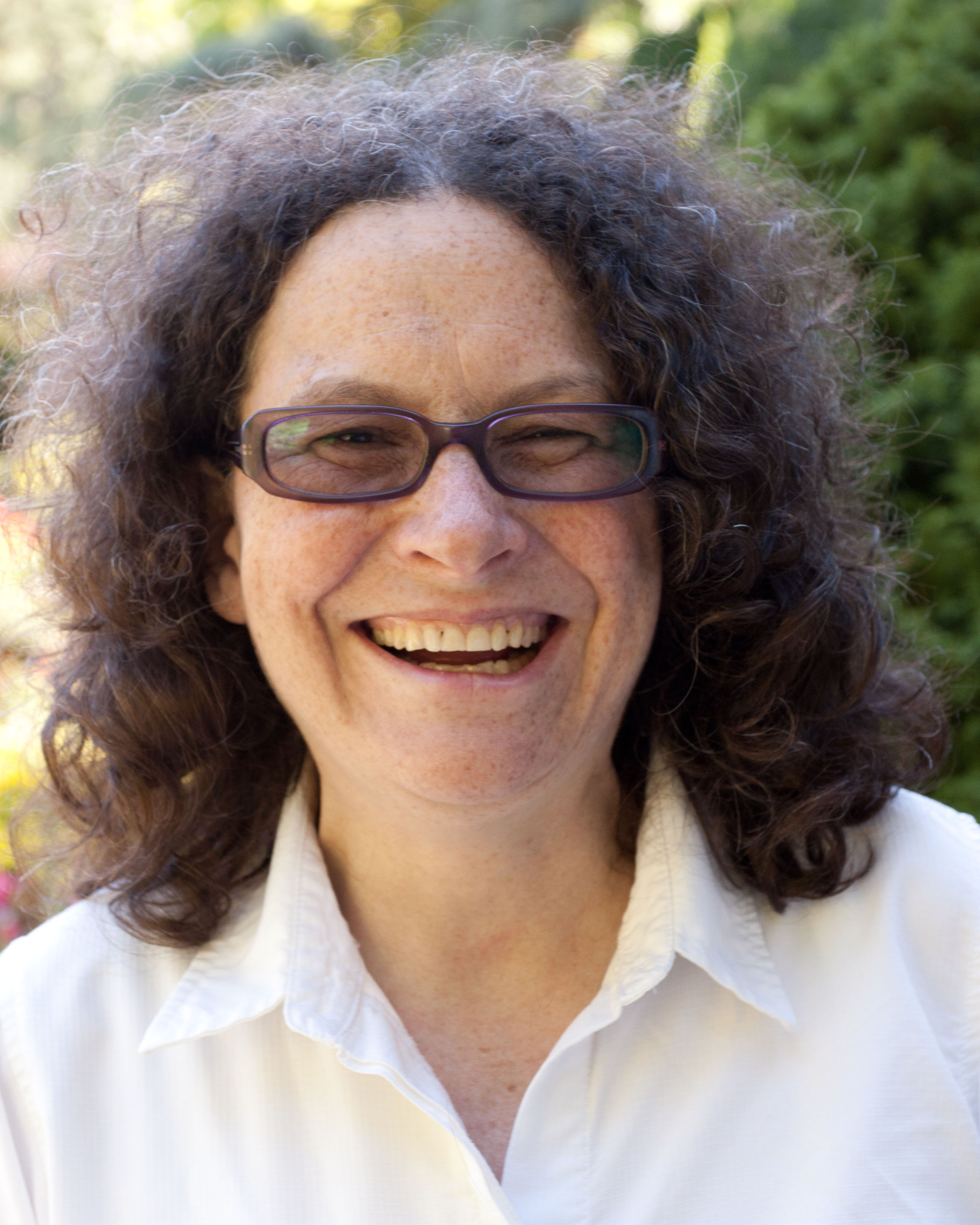
- Ellen at WADS 2015
- Education: University of Waterloo (BS, MS); University of California, Berkeley (PhD)
- Awards: ACM Fellow (2014)
- Scientific career
- Workplaces: University of Toronto
- Thesis: Two Problems in Concrete Complexity: Cycle Detection and Parallel Prefix Computation (1982)
- Doctoral advisor: Richard Karp
- Website: https://www.cs.toronto.edu/~faith/

Faith Ellen (formerly known as Faith E. Fich) is a Canadian professor of computer science at the University of Toronto who studies distributed data structures and the theory of distributed computing.

== Education and career ==
She earned her bachelor's degree and master's from the University of Waterloo in 1977 and 1978, respectively, and doctorate in 1982 from the University of California, Berkeley, under the supervision of Richard Karp; her dissertation concerned lower bounds for cycle detection and parallel prefix sums. She joined the faculty of the University of Washington in 1983, and moved to Toronto in 1986. From 1997 to 2001, she was the vice chair of SIGACT, the leading international society for theory of computation. From 2006 to 2009, she was chair of the steering committee for PODC, a top international conference for theory of distributed computing. In 2014, she also co-authored the book, Impossibility Results for Distributed Computing.

She became a Fellow of the Association for Computing Machinery in 2014.
