= Order-maintenance problem =

Computer science challenge

In computer science, the order-maintenance problem involves maintaining a totally ordered set supporting the following operations:

- insert(X, Y), which inserts X immediately after Y in the total order;
- order(X, Y), which determines if X precedes Y in the total order; and
- delete(X), which removes X from the set.

Paul Dietz first introduced a data structure to solve this problem in 1982. This data structure supports insert(X, Y) in $O(\log n)$ (in Big O notation) amortized time and order(X, Y) in constant time but does not support deletion. Athanasios Tsakalidis used BB[α] trees with the same performance bounds that supports deletion in $O(\log n)$ and improved insertion and deletion performance to $O(1)$ amortized time with indirection. Dietz and Daniel Sleator published an improvement to worst-case constant time in 1987. Michael Bender, Richard Cole and Jack Zito published significantly simplified alternatives in 2002. Bender, Fineman, Gilbert, Kopelowitz and Montes also published a deamortized solution in 2017.

Efficient data structures for order-maintenance have applications in many areas, including data structure persistence, graph algorithms and fault-tolerant data structures.

== List labeling ==
A problem related to the order-maintenance problem is the list-labeling problem in which instead of the order(X, Y) operation the solution must maintain an assignment of labels from a universe of integers $\{1, 2, \ldots, m\}$ to the elements of the set such that X precedes Y in the total order if and only if X is assigned a lesser label than Y. It must also support an operation label(X) returning the label of any node X. Note that order(X, Y) can be implemented simply by comparing label(X) and label(Y) so that any solution to the list-labeling problem immediately gives one to the order-maintenance problem. In fact, most solutions to the order-maintenance problem are solutions to the list-labeling problem augmented with a level of data structure indirection to improve performance. We will see an example of this below.

For a list-labeling problem on sets of size up to $n$, the cost of list labeling depends on how large $m$ is a function of $n$. The relevant parameter range for order maintenance are for $m=n^{1+\Theta(1)}$, for which an $O(\log n)$ amortized cost solution is known, and $2^{\Omega(n)}$ for which a constant time amortized solution is known

== O(1) amortized insertion via indirection ==
Indirection is a technique used in data structures in which a problem is split into multiple levels of a data structure in order to improve efficiency. Typically, a problem of size $n$ is split into $n/\log n$ problems of size $\log n$. For example, this technique is used in y-fast tries. This strategy also works to improve the insertion and deletion performance of the data structure described above to constant amortized time. In fact, this strategy works for any solution of the list-labeling problem with $O(\log n)$ amortized insertion and deletion time.

The order-maintenance data structure with indirection. The total order elements are stored in $O(N/\log N)$ contiguous sublists of size $O(\log N)$, each of which has a representative in the scapegoat tree.

The new data structure is completely rebuilt whenever it grows too large or too small. Let $N$ be the number of elements of the total order when it was last rebuilt. The data structure is rebuilt whenever the invariant $\tfrac{N}{3}\le n\le 2N$ is violated by an insertion or deletion. Since rebuilding can be done in linear time this does not affect the amortized performance of insertions and deletions.

During the rebuilding operation, the $N$ elements of the total order are split into $O(N/\log N)$ contiguous sublists, each of size $\Omega(\log N)$. The list labeling problem is solved on the set set of nodes representing each of the sublists in their original list order. The labels for this subproblem are taken to be polynomial --- say $m=N^2$, so that they can be compared in constant time and updated in amortized $O(\log N)$ time.

For each sublist a doubly-linked list of its elements is built storing with each element a pointer to its representative in the tree as well as a local integer label. The local integer labels are also taken from a range $m = N^2$, so that the can be compared in constant time, but because each local problem involves only $\Theta(\log N)$ items, the labels range $m$ is exponential in the number of items being labeled. Thus, they can be updated in $O(1)$ amortized time.

See the list-labeling problem for details of both solutions.

=== Order ===
Given the sublist nodes X and Y, order(X, Y) can be answered by first checking if the two nodes are in the same sublist. If so, their order can be determined by comparing their local labels. Otherwise the labels of their representatives in the first list-labeling problem are compared. These comparisons take constant time.

=== Insert ===
Given a new sublist node for X and a pointer to the sublist node Y, insert(X, Y) inserts X immediately after Y in the sublist of Y, if there is room for X in the list, that is if the length of the list is no greater than $2\log N$ after the insertion. Its local label is given by the local list labeling algorithm for exponential labels. This case takes $O(1)$ amortized time.

If the local list overflows, it is split evenly into two lists of size $\log N$, and the items in each list are given new labels from their (independent) ranges. This creates a new sublist, which is inserted into the list of sublists, and the new sublist node is given a label in the list of sublists by the list-labeling algorithm. Finally X is inserted into the appropriate list.

This sequence of operations take $O(\log N)$ time, but there have been $\Omega(\log N)$ insertions since the list was created or last split. Thus the amortized time per insertion is $O(1)$.

=== Delete ===
Given a sublist node X to be deleted, delete(X) simply removes X from its sublist in constant time. If this leaves the sublist empty, then we need to remove the representative of the list of sublists. Since at least $\Omega(\log N)$ elements were deleted from the sublist since it was first built we can afford to spend the $O(\log N)$ time, the amortized cost of a deletion is $O(1)$.

== Worst-case constant time ==
The indirection scheme above gives constant time per operation only in the amortized sense: splitting an overfull sublist, and inserting its representative into the top-level structure, can take much longer than a constant in a single operation. To bound every operation by a constant, this work must instead be spread over later operations, a few steps at a time, while order queries and further insertions continue. The difficulty is that the structure must stay consistent, and its labels short, while some of them are only partly updated.

Dietz and Sleator gave the first worst-case constant-time solution in 1987. Their structure is a tree of constant height whose leaves are the list elements. A node that becomes too large is split incrementally, with a constant amount of work in each of the following operations, and the waiting nodes are served largest first. Their analysis of this strategy as a game, in which an adversary increases counters and the player repeatedly resets the largest one to zero, shows that the nodes waiting to be split cannot grow too large in the meantime. At the top, the children of the root are labelled by Willard's algorithm for maintaining a sequentially ordered file in good worst-case time, which is itself intricate.

Bender, Cole, Demaine, Farach-Colton and Zito announced a simpler worst-case algorithm, obtained by deamortizing their amortized one, but as of 2012 its full version had not appeared. Kopelowitz gave a deterministic worst-case constant-time construction, with some details omitted, in which chunks of O(log^{2} n) elements are split largest first and labelled by a weight-balanced B-tree instead of Willard's algorithm, and each insertion into that tree is spread over the following log n insertions. He described the state of the art as follows: "to date there is no published version of a worst-case solution for the OMP which is not considered highly complex". Bender, Fineman, Gilbert, Kopelowitz and Montes later gave a simpler deamortized algorithm for sequential file maintenance, the problem that Willard's algorithm solves.

An algorithm assembled from these components has been implemented as a program for a random-access machine and verified in the Lean proof assistant: the program answers every order query correctly, takes at most a constant number of machine steps per operation, and after t operations computes no value of more than O(log t) bits.
