= Michael Fredman =

American computer scientist

Michael Lawrence Fredman
- Education: Stanford University (PhD)
- Scientific career
- Fields: Computer Science
- Workplaces: Rutgers University
- Thesis: Growth Properties of a Class of Recursively Defined Functions (1972)
- Doctoral advisor: Donald Knuth
- Doctoral students: Michael Fellows; John Iacono

Michael Lawrence Fredman is an emeritus professor at the Computer Science Department at Rutgers University, United States. He earned his Ph.D. from Stanford University in 1972 under the supervision of Donald Knuth. He was a member of the mathematics department at the Massachusetts Institute of Technology from 1974 to 1976. and of the Computer Science and Engineering department at the University of California, San Diego until 1992. Among his contributions to computer science are the development of the Fibonacci heap in a joint work with Robert Tarjan, the transdichotomous model of integer computing with Dan Willard, and the proof of a lower bound showing that Θ(n log n) is the optimal time for solving Klee's measure problem in a joint work with Bruce Weide.
