= Online matrix-vector multiplication problem =

Problem in computational complexity theory

Unsolved problem in computer science
Is there an algorithm for solving the OMv problem in time $O(n^{3-\varepsilon})$, for some constant $\varepsilon>0$?
More unsolved problems in computer science

In computational complexity theory, the online matrix-vector multiplication problem (OMv) asks an online algorithm to return, at each round, the product of an $n\times n$ matrix and a newly-arrived $n$-dimensional vector. OMv is conjectured to require roughly cubic time. This conjectured hardness implies lower bounds on the time needed to solve various dynamic problems and is of particular interest in fine-grained complexity.

== Definition ==
In OMv, an algorithm is given an integer $n$ and an $n\times n$ Boolean matrix $M$. The algorithm then runs for $n$ rounds, and at each round $i$ receives an $n$-dimensional Boolean vector $v_i$ and must return the product $Mv_i$ (before continuing to round $i+1$).

An algorithm is said to solve OMv if, with probability at least $2/3$ over the randomness of the algorithm, it returns the product $Mv_i$ at every round $i$.

=== Variants of OMv ===
The online vector-matrix-vector problem (OuMv) is a variant of OMv where the algorithm receives, at each round $i$, two Boolean vectors $u_i$ and $v_i$, and returns the product $u_i M v_i$. This version has the benefit of returning a Boolean value at each round instead of a vector of an $n$-dimensional Boolean vector. The hardness of OuMv is implied by the hardness of OMv.

More heavily parameterized variants of OMv are also used, where the matrix $M$ is not necessarily square and where the dimension of each vector $v_i$ is not necessarily equal to the number of rounds.

== Conjectured hardness ==
In 2015, Henzinger, Krinninger, Nanongkai, and Saranurak conjectured that OMv cannot be solved in "truly subcubic" time. Formally, they presented the following conjecture:

For any constant $\varepsilon>0$, there is no $O(n^{3-\varepsilon})$-time algorithm that solves OMv with probability at least $2/3$.

=== Algorithms for solving OMv ===
OMv can be solved in $O(n^3)$ time by a naive algorithm that, in each of the $n$ rounds, multiplies the matrix $M$ and the new vector $v_i$ in $O(n^2)$ time. A faster algorithm for OMv is implied by a result of Williams and runs in time $O(n^3/\log^2 n)$. The fastest known algorithm for OMv runs in time $n^3/2^{\Omega{\sqrt{\log n}}}$, due to Larsen and Williams.

=== Implications of conjectured hardness ===
The OMv conjecture implies lower bounds on the time needed to solve a large class of dynamic graph problems, including reachability and connectivity, shortest path, and subgraph detection. For many of these problems, the implied lower bounds have matching upper bounds. While some of these lower bounds also followed from previous conjectures (e.g., 3SUM), many of the lower bounds that follow from OMv are stronger or new.

Later work showed that the OMv conjecture implies lower bounds on the time needed for subgraph counting in average-case graphs.

==== Lower bounds from OMv ====
Several lower bounds for dynamic problems follow from the OMv conjecture. Examples of tight lower bounds include the following.

- Pagh's problem on $k$ subsets from a size-$n$ universe requires linear time.
- Determining s-t reachability for a (worst-case) dynamic graph on a graph with $n$ nodes and $m\leq n^2$ edges requires $\widetilde{\Omega}(m)$ time.
- Counting 4-cycles in average-case, dynamic graphs with $n$ nodes requires $\widetilde{\Omega}(n^2)$ time.
- Counting length-5 paths in average-case, dynamic graphs with $n$ nodes requires $\widetilde{\Omega}(n^3)$ time.
