= Rasmus Pagh =

Danish computer scientist

- Born: 6 February 1975 (age 51); Denmark
- Education: Aarhus University (Ph.D. 2002)
- Awards: WWW Best Paper Award (2014); ESA Test-of-Time Award (2020)
- Scientific career
- Fields: Algorithms; Hashing
- Workplaces: University of Copenhagen
- Thesis: Hashing, randomness and dictionaries
- Doctoral advisor: Peter Bro Miltersen
- Website: rasmuspagh.net

Rasmus Pagh is a Danish computer scientist and a professor of computer science at the University of Copenhagen. His main work is in algorithms and data structures, and he is particularly known for the cuckoo hashing algorithm and for co-founding the Basic Algorithms Research Center, BARC, in Copenhagen.

== Early life and education ==
Rasmus Pagh was born in Copenhagen, but soon after his family moved to Esbjerg in western Denmark. He went to high school at Rødkilde Amtsgymnasium where he participated in the "JP Forsker" science competition, and in the "Georg Mohr" mathematics competition. After graduating in 1994, he went to study mathematics and computer science at Aarhus University. In 1998 he started his PhD with Peter Bro Miltersen and started writing articles about hashing and efficient dictionaries, culminating in his work on cuckoo hashing. Soon after his thesis defence was in the fall of 2002 he became an assistant professor at the recently founded IT University of Copenhagen.

== Career ==
In 2007, Rasmus founded the Scalable Query Evaluation for Reliable Databases (SQERD) project. The project aimed at applying modern algorithmic techniques to problems arising in database management systems in connection with the evaluation of queries. From 2011-2015, he ran the MaDaMS project, which partnered with Demetra A/S, Aarhus University and Apptus AB at finding more efficient approaches to data mining.

Rasmus Pagh was made full professor at ITU with his Inaugural Lecture in 2013. In 2014, he received an ERC Consolidator Grant for a project on Scalable Similarity Search. The project resulted in many new algorithms, including a way to prevent false negatives in high dimensional search. In 2017 Pagh co-founded the Basic Algorithms Research Center, BARC, in Copenhagen with Mikkel Thorup, Thore Husfeldt and Stephen Alstrup. Soon thereafter he took a sabbatical to join the Simons Institute at University of California, Berkeley and become a Google visiting scholar.

In 2019, Rasmus Pagh became an Associate Editor of the SIAM Journal on Computing.

== Recognition ==
In 2020, Rasmus Pagh received the European Symposium on Algorithms Test-of-Time award for his 2001 work on cuckoo hashing with Flemming Friche Rodler. He was named as an ACM Fellow, in the 2024 class of fellows, "for contributions to the theory and practice of randomized algorithms".

== See also ==
- Pagh's problem in dynamic algorithms.
