= Iacono's working set structure =

Dictionary data structure

Iacono's working set data structure
- Invented: 2001
- Invented by: John Iacono

Asymptotic complexity in big O notation
- Space: O(n)
- Search: O(log w(x))
- Insert: O(log n)
- Delete: O(log n)

In computer science, Iacono's working set structure is a comparison based dictionary. It supports insertion, deletion and access operation to maintain a dynamic set of $n$ elements. The working set of an item $x$ is the set of elements that have been accessed in the structure since the last time that $x$ was accessed (or inserted if it was never accessed). Inserting and deleting in the working set structure takes $O(\log n)$ time while accessing an element $x$ takes $O(\log w(x))$. Here, $w(x)$ represents the size of the working set of $x$.

== Structure ==
An example of a search for $x$ in the working set structure. After finding $x$, it is removed from $T_4$ and inserted into $T_1$. Finally, a shift from 1 to 4 is performed in which an element is removed from $T_i$ and inserted into $T_{i+1}$ for $1\leq i <4$.

To store a dynamic set of $n$ elements, this structure consists of a series of Red–black trees, or other Self-balancing binary search trees $T_1, T_2, \ldots, T_k$, and a series of deques (Double-ended queues) $Q_1, Q_2, \ldots Q_k$, where $k = \lceil \log\log n\rceil$. For every $1\leq i\leq k$, tree $T_i$ and deque $Q_i$ share the same contents and pointers are maintained between their corresponding elements. For every $i < k$, the size of $T_i$ and $Q_i$ is $2^{2^i}$. Tree $T_k$ and deque $Q_k$ consist of the remaining elements, i.e., their size is $n - \sum_{i=1}^{k-1} 2^{2^i}$. Therefore, the number of items in all trees and the number of elements in all deques both add up to $n$. Every element that has been inserted in the data structure is stored in exactly one of the trees and its corresponding deque.

== Working set Invariant ==
In the deques of this structure, elements are kept in sorted order according to their working set size. Formally, element $x$ lies after $y$ in deque $Q_i$ if and only if $w(x)< w(y)$. Moreover, for every $1\leq i < k$, the elements in deque $Q_i$ have a smaller working sets than the elements in deque $Q_{i+1}$. This property is referred to as the Working set invariant. Every operation in the data structure maintains the Working set invariant.

== Operations ==
The basic operation in this structure is called shift from $h$ to $j$, where $h$ and $j$ are indices of some trees in the structure. Two cases are considered in a shift from $h$ to $j$: If $h< j$, then for every $h\leq i < j$, taken in increasing order, an item is dequeued from $Q_i$ and enqueued into $Q_{i+1}$. The corresponding item is deleted from $T_i$ and inserted into $T_{i+1}$. The running time of this operation is $O(\sum_{i=h}^{j} \log |T_i|) = O(\sum_{i=h}^{j} \log 2^{2^i}) = O(2^ j)$. Analogously, if $j< h$, then for every $j < i \leq h$, taken in decreasing order, an item is dequeued from $Q_i$ and enqueued into $Q_{i-1}$. The corresponding item is deleted from $T_i$ and inserted into $T_{i-1}$. The running time of this operation is $O(\sum_{i=j}^{h} \log |T_i|) = O(\sum_{i=j}^{h} \log 2^{2^i}) = O(2^ h)$. Regardless of the case, after a shift operation, the size of $T_h$ decreases by one whereas the size of $T_j$ increases by one. Since that elements in the deques are sorted with respect to their working sets sizes, a shift operation maintains the Working set invariant.

=== Search ===
To search for an element $x$, search for $x$ in $T_1, T_2, \ldots T_k$, in increasing order, until finding a tree $T_j$ containing $x$. If no tree is found, the search is unsuccessful. If $x$ is found, it is deleted from $T_j$ and then inserted into $T_1$, i.e., it is moved to the front of the structure. The search finishes by performing a shift from $1$ to $j$ which restores the size of every tree and every deque to their size prior to the search operation. The running time of this search is $O(\sum_{i=1}^{j} \log 2^{2^i}) = O(2^ j)$ if the search was successful, or $O(\sum_{i=j}^{k} \log 2^{2^i}) = O(2^k) = O(\log n)$ otherwise. By the Working set property, every element in trees $T_1, T_2, \ldots, T_{j-1}$ belongs to the working set of $x$. In particular, every element in $T_{j-1}$ belongs to the working set of $x$ and hence, $w(x) > |T_{j-1}| = 2^{2^{j-1}}$. Thus, the running time of a successful search is $O(2^j) = O(\log 2^{2^{j-1}}) = O(\log w(x))$.

=== Insert ===
Inserting an element $x$ into the structure is performed by inserting $x$ into $T_1$ and enqueuing it into $Q_1$. Insertion is completed by performing a shift from $1$ to $k$. To avoid overflow, if $|T_k| = 2^{2^k}$ before the shift, i.e., if the last tree is full, then $k$ is incremented and a new empty $T_k$ and $Q_k$ is created. The running time of this operation is dominated by the shift from $1$ to $k$ whose running time is $O(2^k) = O(2^{\log\log n}) = O(\log n)$. Since element $x$, whose working set is the smallest, is enqueued in $Q_1$, the Working set invariant is preserved after the shift.

=== Delete ===
Deleting an element $x$ is done by searching for $x$ on each tree in the structure, in increasing order, until finding a tree $T_j$ that contains it (if non is found the deletion is unsuccessful). Item $x$ is deleted from $T_j$ and $Q_j$. Finally, a shift from $k$ to $j$ maintains the size of $T_j$ equal to $2^{2^j}$. The running time of this operation is $O(2^k) = O(\log n)$. The working set invariant is preserved as deleting an element does not change the order of the working set of the elements.

== Discussion ==
Splay trees are self adjusting search trees introduced by Sleator and Tarjan in 1985. Using restructuring heuristic, splay trees are able to achieve insert and delete operations in $O(\log n)$ amortized time, without storing any balance information at the nodes. Moreover, the Working Set Theorem for splay trees states that the cost to access an element in a splay tree is $O(\log w(x))$ amortized. Iacono's workings set structure obtains the same running time for search, insert and delete in the worst-case. Therefore, offering an alternative to splay trees.
