= Mikkel Thorup =

Danish computer scientist

- Born: 1965 (age 60–61); Denmark
- Education: Oxford University, Technical University of Denmark
- Scientific career
- Fields: Computer Science
- Workplaces: University of Copenhagen
- Thesis: Topics in computation (1994)
- Doctoral advisor: William F. "Bill" McColl; Colin McDiarmid

Mikkel Thorup (born 1965) is a Danish computer scientist working at University of Copenhagen. He completed his undergraduate education at Technical University of Denmark and his doctoral studies at Oxford University in 1993. From 1993 to 1998, he was at University of Copenhagen and from 1998 to 2013 he was at AT&T Labs-Research in New Jersey. Since 2013 he has been at the University of Copenhagen as a Professor and Head of Center for Efficient Algorithms and Data Structures (EADS).

Thorup's main work is in algorithms and data structures. One of his best-known results is a linear-time algorithm for the single-source shortest paths problem in undirected graphs (Thorup, 1999). With Mihai Pătraşcu he has shown that simple tabulation hashing schemes achieve the same or similar performance criteria as hash families that have higher independence in worst case, while permitting speedier implementations.

Thorup has been editor of the area algorithm and data structures for Journal of the ACM, and has also served on the editorial boards of SIAM Journal on Computing, ACM Transactions on Algorithms, and the Theory of Computing. He has been a Fellow of the Association for Computing Machinery since 2005 for his contributions to algorithms and data structures. He belongs to the Royal Danish Academy of Sciences and Letters since 2006. In 2010 he was bestowed the AT&T Fellows Honor for “outstanding innovation in algorithms, including advanced hashing and sampling techniques applied to AT&T's Internet traffic analysis and speech services.”

In 2011 he was co-winner of the David P. Robbins Prize from the Mathematical Association of America for solving, to within a constant factor, the classic problem of stacking blocks on a table to achieve the maximum possible overhang, i.e., reaching out the furthest horizontal distance from the edge of the table. “The papers describe an impressive result in discrete mathematics; the problem is easily understood and the arguments, despite their depth, are easily accessible to any motivated undergraduate.” In 2021 he was co-winner of the Fulkerson Prize for his work with Ken-Ichi Kawarabayashi on fast deterministic algorithms for edge connectivity.

== Selected publications ==
- Thorup, Mikkel (1999). "Undirected Single Source Shortest Paths with Positive Integer Weights in Linear Time". Journal of the ACM. 46 (3): 362–394. doi:10.1145/316542.316548. S2CID 207654795. Announced at FOCS 1997.
- Pătraşcu, Mihai; Thorup, Mikkel (2010). "Higher lower bounds for near-neighbor and further rich problems". SIAM Journal on Computing. 39 (2): 730–741. doi:10.1137/070684859. S2CID 8324376. Preliminary version published in FOCS 2006, doi:10.1109/FOCS.2006.35.
- Pătraşcu, Mihai; Thorup, Mikkel (2011). "The power of simple tabulation hashing". Proceedings of the 43rd annual ACM Symposium on Theory of Computing (STOC '11). pp. 1–10. arXiv:1011.5200. doi:10.1145/1993636.1993638..
- Paterson, Mike; Peres, Yuval; Thorup, Mikkel; Winkler, Peter; Zwick, Uri (2009). "Maximum overhang". The American Mathematical Monthly. 116 (9): 763–787. arXiv:0707.0093. doi:10.4169/000298909x474855. S2CID 1713091. 2011 MAA Robbins Award.
