= Mihai Pătrașcu (computer scientist) =

Romanian-American computer scientist

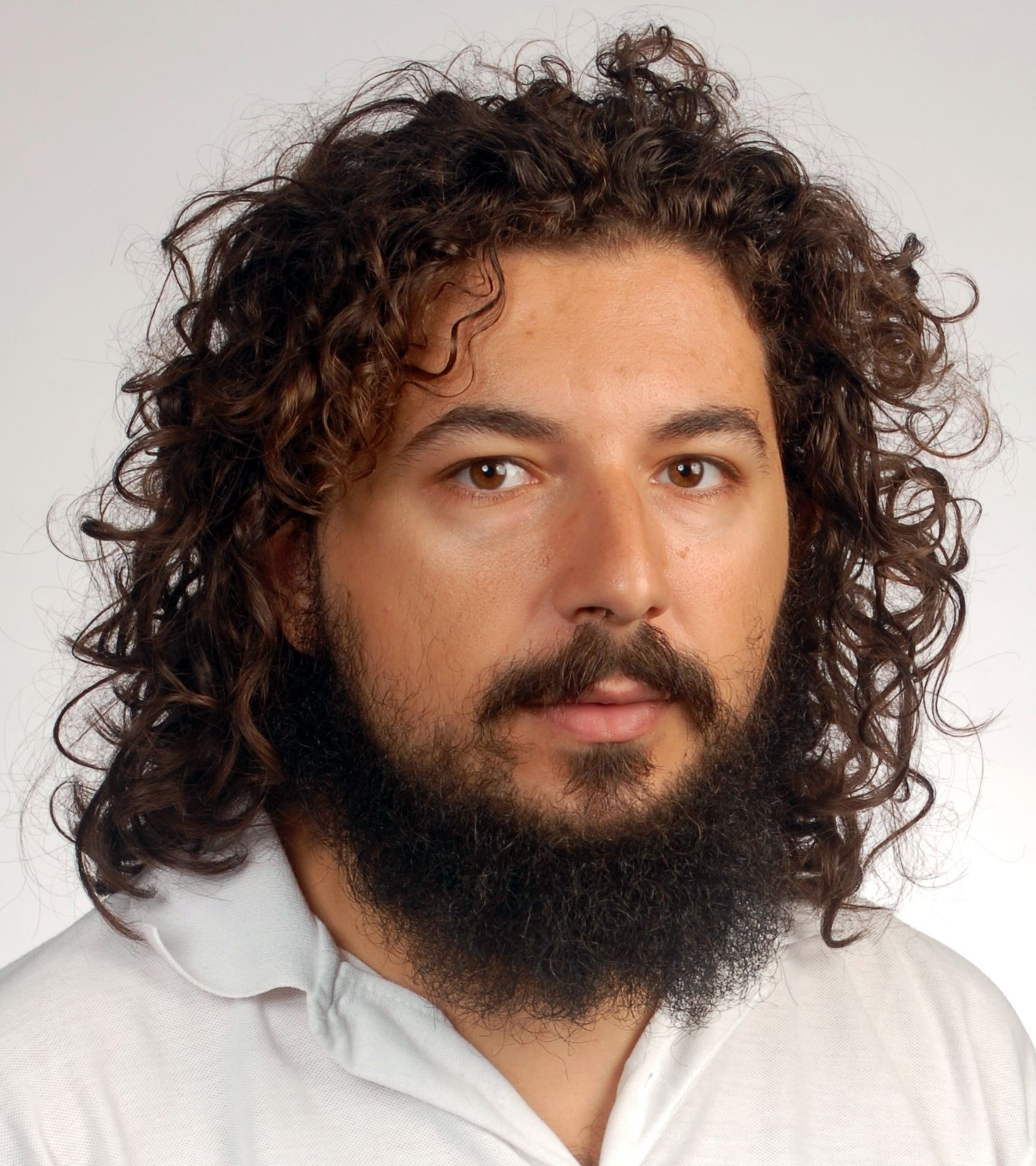
- Born: 17 July 1982; Craiova, Romania
- Died: 5 June 2012 (aged 29); New York City, United States
- Resting place: Craiova
- Education: Massachusetts Institute of Technology
- Scientific career
- Fields: Computer Science
- Workplaces: AT&T Labs
- Thesis: Lower bound techniques for data structures (2008)
- Doctoral advisor: Erik Demaine

Mihai Pătrașcu (17 July 1982 – 5 June 2012) was a Romanian-American computer scientist at AT&T Labs in Florham Park, New Jersey, United States.

Pătrașcu attended Carol I National College in Craiova. As a high school student, he won 2 gold medals and 1 silver medal at the International Olympiad in Informatics. After attending for one year the University of Craiova, he completed his undergraduate and graduate studies in Computer Science at Massachusetts Institute of Technology. Under the supervision of Erik Demaine, he defended his MS and PhD theses in 2007 and 2008 respectively.

Pătrașcu’s work was concerned with fundamental questions about basic data structures. He received the Machtey Award for the best student paper at the Symposium on Foundations of Computer Science in 2008, and the Presburger Award from the European Association for Theoretical Computer Science in 2012, for breaking "many old barriers on fundamental data structure problems, not only revitalizing but also revolutionizing a field that was almost silent for over a decade."

Mihai Pătrașcu died in 2012 at the age of 29 after suffering from brain cancer for a year and a half, and was buried in his native city, Craiova.

== Selected publications ==
- Chan, Timothy M.; Pătrașcu, Mihai; Roditty, Liam (2011). "Dynamic connectivity: connecting to networks and geometry" (PDF). SIAM Journal on Computing. 40 (2): 333–349. arXiv:0808.1128. doi:10.1137/090751670. S2CID 11747895. Preliminary version published in FOCS 2008, doi:10.1109/FOCS.2008.29.
- Pătrașcu, Mihai (2011). "Unifying the landscape of cell-probe lower bounds" (PDF). SIAM Journal on Computing. 40 (3): 827–847. doi:10.1137/09075336X. S2CID 14707610.
- Chan, Timothy; Pătraşcu, Mihai (2010). "Transdichotomous results in computational geometry, I: Point location in sublogarithmic time" (PDF). SIAM Journal on Computing. 39 (2): 703–729. doi:10.1137/07068669X. hdl:1721.1/64948.
- Pătrașcu, Mihai; Thorup, Mikkel (2010). "Higher lower bounds for near-neighbor and further rich problems" (PDF). SIAM Journal on Computing. 39 (2): 730–741. doi:10.1137/070684859. S2CID 8324376. Preliminary version published in FOCS 2006, doi:10.1109/FOCS.2006.35.
- Demaine, Erik; Harmon, Dion; Iacono, John; Pătrașcu, Mihai (2007). "Dynamic optimality—almost" (PDF). SIAM Journal on Computing. 37 (1): 240–251. doi:10.1137/S0097539705447347. S2CID 1480961. Preliminary version published in FOCS 2004, doi:10.1109/FOCS.2004.23. See Tango tree.
- Pătrașcu, Mihai; Demaine, Erik (2006). "Logarithmic lower bounds in the cell-probe model" (PDF). SIAM Journal on Computing. 35 (4): 932–963. arXiv:cs/0502041. doi:10.1137/S0097539705447256. S2CID 2202874.
