= Tarjan's algorithm =

Tarjan's algorithm may refer to one of several algorithms attributed to Robert Tarjan, including:

- Tarjan's strongly connected components algorithm
- Tarjan's off-line lowest common ancestors algorithm
- Tarjan's algorithm for finding bridges in an undirected graph
- Tarjan's algorithm for finding simple circuits in a directed graph

== See also ==
- List of algorithms
