= Rmq =

Rmq or rmq may refer to:

- Caló language (ISO-639-3 code)
- Taichung International Airport
- Range minimum query
