= RMQ =

RMQ may refer to

- Taichung International Airport (IATA airport code)
- Range minimum query, a problem in computer science
- RabbitMQ, an Advanced Message Queuing Protocol implementation
