= Kleinberg =

Kleinberg may refer to:

- Jon Kleinberg, an American computer scientist, brother of Robert
- Robert Kleinberg, an American computer scientist, brother of Jon
- Kleinburg, Ontario, a small unincorporated village located in Ontario, Canada
