= HLD =

HLD may refer to:

== Transport ==
- Hellifield railway station, in England
- Hoek van Holland Haven railway station, in the Netherlands
- Holdrege (Amtrak station), in Nebraska, United States
- Hulunbuir Hailar Airport, in China

== Other uses ==
- Dresden High Magnetic Field Laboratory (German: Hochfeld-Magnetlabor Dresden)
- Duan language, spoken in Laos and Vietnam
- Henderson Land Development, a Hong Kong property developer
- Heavy-Light Decomposition
- High-level design
- Highland (council area), in Scotland, Chapman code
- Hold (baseball)
- Homeland defense
- Hyper Light Drifter
- Hyperlipidemia
