= James Tarjan =

American chess grandmaster (born 1952)

Personal information
- Born: James Edward Tarjan; February 22, 1952 (age 74) Pomona, California, U.S.

Chess career
- Country: United States
- Title: Grandmaster (1976)
- Peak rating: 2540 (July 1981)

James Edward Tarjan (born February 22, 1952, in Pomona, California) is an American chess Grandmaster.

== Early life and education ==
James Tarjan was born in Pomona, California in 1952. His father, George Tarjan, raised in Hungary, was a child psychiatrist. James Tarjan's older brother Robert became a computer scientist and mathematician.

Tarjan earned his undergraduate degree from the University of California, Berkeley, and later received his MLS from UCLA.

== Chess career ==
Tarjan began his chess career at 14 by winning the California Junior Chess Championship in 1966. He was 17 when he was selected to join the American team for the 1969 World Students' Olympiad, at Dresden. He was a member of the winning American side at Haifa 1970, and was selected again at Graz 1972.

He finished second at an invitational junior tournament at Norwich 1972, with 12/15, behind Hungarian Gyula Sax. He won the American Open in Santa Monica in 1973, and was co-winner of the same tournament in 1982.

Tarjan earned his International Master title in 1974, followed by the Grandmaster title in 1976. He played for the American team at five straight chess Olympiads. He began at Nice 1974, then played at Haifa 1976, Buenos Aires 1978, Valletta 1980, and Lucerne 1982. He won the Olympiad gold medal for best individual results in both 1974 and 1978.

His best results in international tournaments include first at Subotica 1975, first at Vancouver 1976, and first equal at Vršac 1983, along with Predrag Nikolić and Georgy Agzamov. Other good finishes included tied for third at Chicago 1973 with 7/11; tied for fifth at Venice 1974 with 7.5/13; and an excellent tied second at Bogotá 1979, with 10.5/14, behind only Alexander Beliavsky.

Tarjan played in several U.S. Championships during the 1970s and 1980s. He was fourth at El Paso 1973 with 7.5/12. At Oberlin 1975, he ended up tied for sixth with a score of 6.5/13. At Pasadena 1978, which was the Zonal qualifier, he tied for second with 9.5/14, and advanced to the 1979 Riga Interzonal, part of the World Championship cycle. He scored 8.5/17 and did not advance; the tournament was won by former World Champion Mikhail Tal. Tarjan's last competitive tournament for three decades was the 1984 U.S. Championship at Berkeley, where he finished tied for third, scoring 10.5/17.

In 1984, Tarjan gave up professional chess to become a librarian, and worked for many years at the Santa Cruz Public Library.

In 2014, Tarjan re-entered the tournament chess world. He played in the U.S. Open in Orlando in August finishing with 7.0/9, half a point behind a six-way tie for first place. Subsequently, he played in the PokerStars International Tournament on the Isle of Man in October 2014. He also competed in the Larry Evans Memorial in Reno, Nevada, over the Easter weekend, finishing in an 8-way tie for second.

In the 2017 Isle of Man International Masters tournament, he defeated former world champion Vladimir Kramnik in the third round. and former women's world champion Alexandra Kosteniuk.

He won the Oregon Open held in Portland, Oregon, under sponsorship of the Oregon Chess Federation and Portland Chess Club in 2017. He tied for 7th place in 2018 US Open held in Wisconsin. He won 2018 Seattle Chess Classic with 7–2 score, which included two half-point byes. He took the Age 50+ prize also. On National Chess Day October 13, 2018, he was scheduled to give a 20-board simul at Vancouver Mall in Vancouver, Washington. He scored 14–0.

== Later life ==
In recent years Tarjan has been honored by several lifetime achievement awards. In 2022 he was inducted in the U.S. Chess Hall of Fame. In 2025 he was given the Frank J. Marshall Award as an excellent ambassador for chess.
