= George Tarjan =

Hungarian-American psychiatrist (1912–1991)

- Born: 1912; Zsolna, Kingdom of Hungary (now Žilina, Slovakia)
- Died: December 7, 1991 (aged 78–79)
- Education: University of Debrecen; University of Budapest (M.D.)
- Occupation: Psychiatrist
- Organizations: American Psychiatric Association, American Academy of Child and Adolescent Psychiatry, University of California, Los Angeles
- Known for: Child psychiatry, intellectual disability research, President of the American Psychiatric Association
- Spouse: Helen Blome (m. 1941)
- Children: Robert Tarjan; James Tarjan

George Tarjan (1912 – December 7, 1991) was a Hungarian-born American psychiatrist who specialized in child psychiatry and intellectual disability. He served as the 112th president of the American Psychiatric Association (APA) from 1983 to 1984 and directed the Division of Mental Retardation and Child Psychiatry at the UCLA Neuropsychiatric Institute. He was the first international medical graduate to serve as president of the APA.

== Early life and education ==
Tarjan was born into a Jewish family in 1912 in Zsolna, Hungary (now Žilina, Slovakia). His father taught German and Hungarian literature, and his mother came from Vienna. His family moved to Miskolc after World War I.

Tarjan entered medical school at the University of Debrecen, but his education was interrupted by required military service. He later transferred to the University of Budapest, where he received his M.D. in 1935. He completed an internship at the Jewish Hospital in Budapest, where he decided to specialize in psychiatry.

Tarjan left Hungary in 1939. He escaped Europe before the outbreak of the Second World War and immigrated to the United States. His parents and younger brother later died during the Holocaust.

== Career ==
Tarjan passed the New York medical licensing examination and completed an internship at Menorah Hospital in Kansas City, Missouri. He then completed a residency at Mercy Hospital in Janesville, Wisconsin, followed by a psychiatric residency at Provo State Hospital in Utah.

He became a United States citizen in 1943 and served in the United States Army during World War II. He later retired from the United States Army Reserve with the rank of colonel.

Following military service, Tarjan became Director of Clinical Services at Peoria State Hospital. In 1947 he joined Pacific State Hospital in Pomona, California, becoming medical director in 1949. During his sixteen-year tenure he expanded research and clinical services for people with intellectual disabilities.

In 1965 Tarjan joined the UCLA Neuropsychiatric Institute as director of its Division of Mental Retardation and Child Psychiatry. At UCLA he established research programs in developmental disabilities, secured federal and state funding, and trained physicians and researchers.

== Public service and leadership ==
Tarjan served on the National Advisory Mental Health Council and was appointed by President John F. Kennedy as vice chairman of the President's Panel on Mental Retardation. He later served on Jimmy Carter's President's Commission on Mental Health and advised the Select Congressional Panel on Promotion of Child Health.

He served as president of the Southern California Psychiatric Society, secretary of the American Psychiatric Association, president of the American Academy of Child and Adolescent Psychiatry, and president of the American Association on Intellectual and Developmental Disabilities.

In 1983 Tarjan was elected the 112th president of the American Psychiatric Association. He was the first APA president whose medical education was completed in a language other than English. During his presidency he led the APA delegation to the World Psychiatric Association meeting in Vienna.

Tarjan authored six books, more than 100 scholarly articles, and 39 book chapters, primarily on intellectual disability.

== Personal life ==
Tarjan married Helen Blome in 1941. They had two sons, Robert Tarjan and James Tarjan.

He died of mitral stenosis on December 7, 1991.

== Legacy ==
Tarjan expanded services for children with developmental disabilities and contributed to research on intellectual disability. He also served on federal advisory bodies concerned with mental health and developmental disabilities and advocated greater participation by international medical graduates in American psychiatry.

The UCLA Tarjan Center is named in his honor.

The American Psychiatric Association established the George Tarjan Award in 1992 to recognize physicians who have made significant contributions to the integration of international medical graduates into American psychiatry.

The American Academy of Child and Adolescent Psychiatry presents the George Tarjan, M.D., Award for Contributions in Developmental Disabilities to a child and adolescent psychiatrist who has made significant contributions to the understanding or care of individuals with developmental disabilities.

Archival records and oral history interviews relating to Tarjan are preserved by the National Library of Medicine and the UCLA Library.

== Awards and honors ==
Tarjan received numerous honors during his career, including:

- APA Leadership Award
- AAMS Award (1970)
- Kennedy Foundation Award (1971)
- Award of Merit, Presidential Commission on Mental Retardation (1972)
- APA Distinguished Service Award (1973)
