= Greedy embedding =

In distributed computing and geometric graph theory, greedy embedding is a process of assigning coordinates to the nodes of a telecommunications network in order to allow greedy geographic routing to be used to route messages within the network. Although greedy embedding has been proposed for use in wireless sensor networks, in which the nodes already have positions in physical space, these existing positions may differ from the positions given to them by greedy embedding, which may in some cases be points in a virtual space of a higher dimension, or in a non-Euclidean geometry. In this sense, greedy embedding may be viewed as a form of graph drawing, in which an abstract graph (the communications network) is embedded into a geometric space.

The idea of performing geographic routing using coordinates in a virtual space, instead of using physical coordinates, is due to Rao et al. Subsequent developments have shown that every network has a greedy embedding with succinct vertex coordinates in the hyperbolic plane, that certain graphs including the polyhedral graphs have greedy embeddings in the Euclidean plane, and that unit disk graphs have greedy embeddings in Euclidean spaces of moderate dimensions with low stretch factors.

== Definitions ==
In greedy routing, a message from a source node s to a destination node t travels to its destination by a sequence of steps through intermediate nodes, each of which passes the message on to a neighboring node that is closer to t. If the message reaches an intermediate node x that does not have a neighbor closer to t, then it cannot make progress and the greedy routing process fails. A greedy embedding is an embedding of the given graph with the property that a failure of this type is impossible. Thus, it can be characterized as an embedding of the graph with the property that for every two nodes x and t, there exists a neighbor y of x such that d(x,t) > d(y,t), where d denotes the distance in the embedded space.

== Graphs with no greedy embedding ==
K_{1,6}, a graph with no greedy embedding in the Euclidean plane

Not every graph has a greedy embedding into the Euclidean plane; a simple counterexample is given by the star K_{1,6}, a tree with one internal node and six leaves. Whenever this graph is embedded into the plane, some two of its leaves must form an angle of 60 degrees or less, from which it follows that at least one of these two leaves does not have a neighbor that is closer to the other leaf.

In Euclidean spaces of higher dimensions, more graphs may have greedy embeddings; for instance, K_{1,6} has a greedy embedding into three-dimensional Euclidean space, in which the internal node of the star is at the origin and the leaves are a unit distance away along each coordinate axis. However, for every Euclidean space of fixed dimension, there are graphs that cannot be embedded greedily: whenever the number n is greater than the kissing number of the space, the graph K_{1,n} has no greedy embedding.

== Hyperbolic and succinct embeddings ==
Unlike the case for the Euclidean plane, every network has a greedy embedding into the hyperbolic plane. The original proof of this result, by Robert Kleinberg, required the node positions to be specified with high precision, but subsequently it was shown that, by using a heavy path decomposition of a spanning tree of the network, it is possible to represent each node succinctly, using only a logarithmic number of bits per point. In contrast, there exist graphs that have greedy embeddings in the Euclidean plane, but for which any such embedding requires a polynomial number of bits for the Cartesian coordinates of each point.

== Special classes of graphs ==
=== Trees ===
The class of trees that admit greedy embeddings into the Euclidean plane has been completely characterized, and a greedy embedding of a tree can be found in linear time when it exists.

For more general graphs, some greedy embedding algorithms such as the one by Kleinberg start by finding a spanning tree of the given graph, and then construct a greedy embedding of the spanning tree. The result is necessarily also a greedy embedding of the whole graph. However, there exist graphs that have a greedy embedding in the Euclidean plane but for which no spanning tree has a greedy embedding.

=== Planar graphs ===
Unsolved problem in mathematics
Does every polyhedral graph have a planar greedy embedding with convex faces?
More unsolved problems in mathematics

Papadimitriou & Ratajczak (2005) conjectured that every polyhedral graph (a 3-vertex-connected planar graph, or equivalently by Steinitz's theorem the graph of a convex polyhedron) has a greedy embedding into the Euclidean plane. By exploiting the properties of cactus graphs, Leighton & Moitra (2010) proved the conjecture; the greedy embeddings of these graphs can be defined succinctly, with logarithmically many bits per coordinate. However, the greedy embeddings constructed according to this proof are not necessarily planar embeddings, as they may include crossings between pairs of edges. For maximal planar graphs, in which every face is a triangle, a greedy planar embedding can be found by applying the Knaster–Kuratowski–Mazurkiewicz lemma to a weighted version of a straight-line embedding algorithm of Schnyder. The strong Papadimitriou–Ratajczak conjecture, that every polyhedral graph has a planar greedy embedding in which all faces are convex, remains unproven.

=== Unit disk graphs ===
The wireless sensor networks that are the target of greedy embedding algorithms are frequently modeled as unit disk graphs, graphs in which each node is represented as a unit disk and each edge corresponds to a pair of disks with nonempty intersection. For this special class of graphs, it is possible to find succinct greedy embeddings into a Euclidean space of polylogarithmic dimension, with the additional property that distances in the graph are accurately approximated by distances in the embedding, so that the paths followed by greedy routing are short.
