= Priority search tree =

In computer science, a priority search tree is a tree data structure for storing points in two dimensions. It was originally introduced by Edward M. McCreight. It is effectively an extension of the priority queue with the purpose of improving the search time from O(n) to O(s + log n) time, where n is the number of points in the tree and s is the number of points returned by the search.

== Description ==
The priority search tree is used to store a set of 2-dimensional points ordered by priority and by a key value. This is accomplished by creating a hybrid of a priority queue and a binary search tree.

The result is a tree where each node represents a point in the original dataset. The point contained by the node is the one with the lowest priority. In addition, each node also contains a key value used to divide the remaining points (usually the median of the keys, excluding the point of the node) into a left and right subtree. The points are divided by comparing their key values to the node key, delegating the ones with lower keys to the left subtree, and the ones strictly greater to the right subtree.

== Operations ==
=== Construction ===
The construction of the tree requires O(n log n) time and O(n) space. A construction algorithm is proposed below:

tree construct_tree(data) {
    if length(data) > 1 {
        node_point = find_point_with_minimum_priority(data) // Select the point with the lowest priority
        reduced_data = remove_point_from_data(data, node_point)
        node_key = calculate_median(reduced_data) // calculate median, excluding the selected point
        
        // Divide the points 
        left_data = []
        right_data = []        
     
        for (point in reduced_data) {
            if point.key <= node_key
                left_data.append(point)
            else
                right_data.append(point)
        }

        left_subtree = construct_tree(left_data)
        right_subtree = construct_tree(right_data)

        return node // Node containing the node_key, node_point and the left and right subtrees
    } else if length(data) == 1 {
         return leaf node // Leaf node containing the single remaining data point
    } else if length(data) == 0 {
        return null // This node is empty
    }
}

However, if the points are sorted by their key values then the tree can be constructed in linear time. This can easily be done by constructing a balanced binary tree over the key values (as leaves) in linear time. Each internal node stores a pointer to the lowest priority node and count of number of items in the subtree rooted at that node. Thus, the node with minimum priority can be identified in constant time. The median of remaining points and the item with next smallest priority can be identified in O(log n) time. Thus, the recurrence relation is T(n)=2T(n/2)+O(log n)=O(n).

=== Grounded range search ===
The priority search tree can be efficiently queried for a key in a closed interval and for a maximum priority value. That is, one can specify an interval [min_key, max_key] and another interval [-∞, max_priority] and return the points contained within it. This is illustrated in the following pseudo code:

points search_tree(tree, min_key, max_key, max_priority) {
    root = get_root_node(tree) 
    result = []

    if get_child_count(root) > 0 {
        if get_point_priority(root) > max_priority
            return null // Nothing interesting will exist in this branch. Return

        if min_key <= get_point_key(root) <= max_key // is the root point one of interest?
            result.append(get_point(node))
     
        if min_key < get_node_key(root) // Should we search left subtree?
            result.append(search_tree(root.left_sub_tree, min_key, max_key, max_priority))

        if get_node_key(root) < max_key // Should we search right subtree?
            result.append(search_tree(root.right_sub_tree, min_key, max_key, max_priority))
            
        return result
    else { // This is a leaf node
        if get_point_priority(root) < max_priority and min_key <= get_point_key(root) <= max_key // is leaf point of interest?
            result.append(get_point(node))
    }
}

== See also ==
- Range tree
