= Robert Kleinberg =

American computer scientist

Robert David Kleinberg
- Education: Cornell University; Massachusetts Institute of Technology
- Known for: Algorithms
- Scientific career
- Fields: Computer Science
- Workplaces: Cornell University
- Doctoral advisor: Tom Leighton
- Website: www.cs.cornell.edu/~rdk/

Robert David Kleinberg (also referred to as Bobby Kleinberg) is an American theoretical computer scientist and professor of Computer Science at Cornell University.

== Early life ==
Robert Kleinberg was one of the finalists at the 1989 Mathcounts. He was a member of the 1991 and 1992 USA teams in the International Mathematical Olympiad, winning a silver medal and a gold medal, respectively. He was also a Putnam Fellow in 1996.

He graduated from Iroquois Central High School in Elma, NY, where he was valedictorian.

He is the younger brother of fellow Cornell computer scientist Jon Kleinberg.

== Research ==
Robert Kleinberg is known for his research work on group theoretic algorithms for matrix multiplication, online learning, network coding and greedy embedding, social networks and algorithmic game theory.

== Career ==
Robert Kleinberg received a B.A. in mathematics from Cornell University in 1997 and a Ph.D. in mathematics under Tom Leighton from MIT in 2005. He was a winner of the prestigious Hertz Fellowship, which supported him during his graduate studies. In 2006, he joined the Department of Computer Science at Cornell University as an assistant professor. His work has been supported by an NSF Career Award, a Microsoft Research New Faculty Fellowship, a Sloan Foundation Fellowship, and a Google Research Grant.
