= Baruch Schieber =

Professor of computer science

- ברוך שיבר
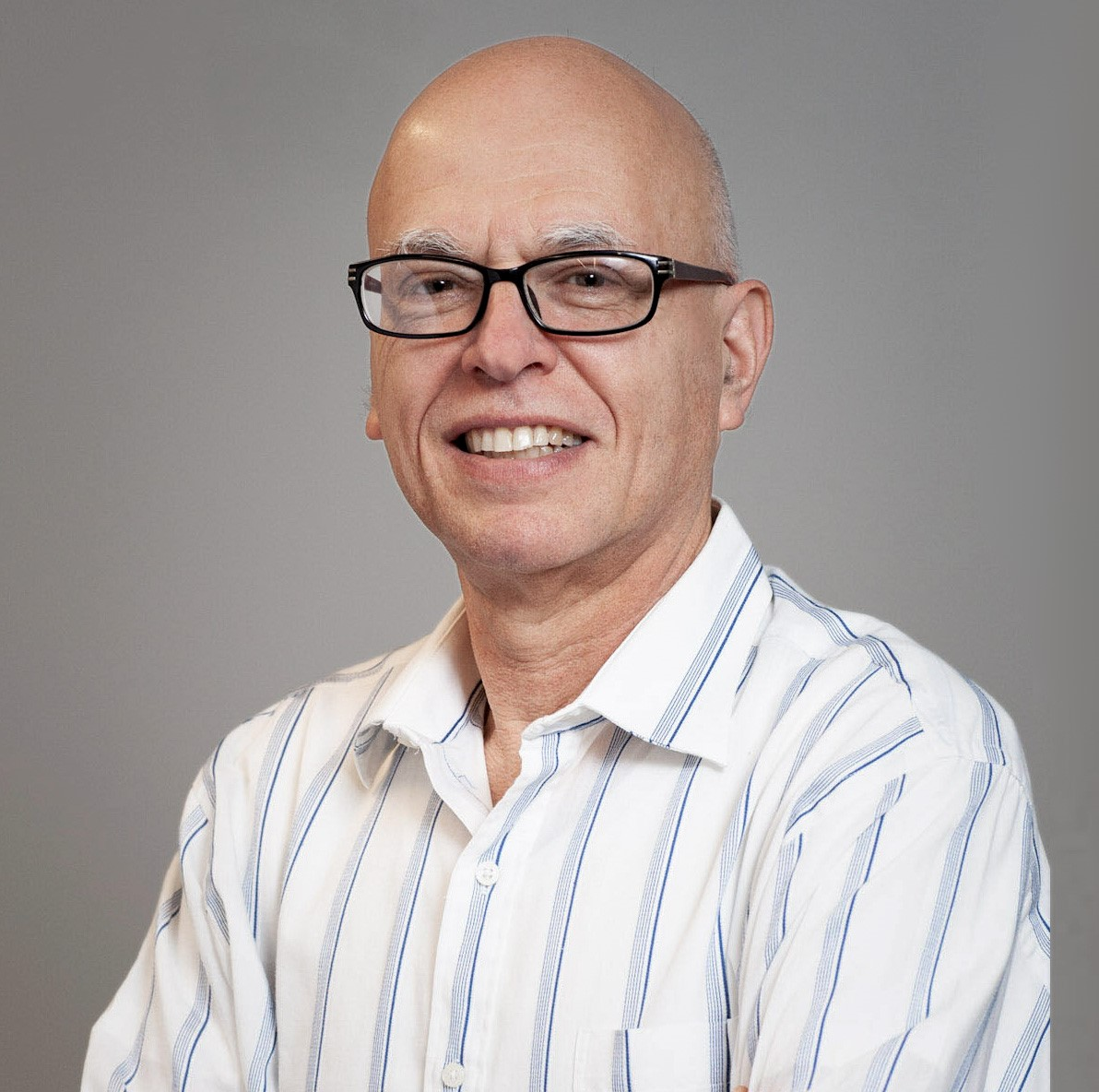
- Born: December 1958 (age 67)
- Education: Technion, Tel Aviv University
- Scientific career
- Fields: Computer Science
- Workplaces: New Jersey Institute of Technology, IBM T.J. Watson Research Center
- Thesis: The design and analysis of parallel algorithms (1987)
- Doctoral advisor: Uzi Vishkin

Baruch M. Schieber (Hebrew: ברוך שיבר; born: December 1958) is a Professor of the Department of Computer Science at the New Jersey Institute of Technology (NJIT) and Director of the Institute for Future Technologies.

== Early life and education ==
Baruch Schieber was born in Tel Aviv and was raised in Givatayim (a suburb of Tel Aviv). His father was a bank branch manager and his mother a housemaker. He graduated from Zeitlin High School in 1976.

Upon high school graduation, he began his academic studies at the Computer Science department of the Technion - Israel Institute of Technology in 1977 and received his B.Sc. in 1980 (summa cum laude). He then started his 5-year military service in unit 8200 of the Israeli Intelligence and reached the rank of lieutenant. While in the army he received his M.Sc. from the Computer Science department of the Technion - Israel Institute of Technology in 1984. He continued his Ph.D. studies at Tel Aviv University until 1987. His thesis on the design and analysis of parallel algorithms was supervised by Dr. Uzi Vishkin.

From 1987 to 1989 Schieber was a Postdoctoral Fellow at the Theory of Computation, Mathematical Sciences Department of IBM T.J. Watson Research Center, Yorktown Heights, New York.

== Career ==
Schieber joined IBM T.J. Watson Research Center at Yorktown Heights in 1989 as a Research Staff Member in the Theory of Computation, Mathematical Sciences Department. In 1995 he became the manager of the department. From 2001 to 2015 Schieber served as the manager of the Optimization Center, Business Analytics and Mathematical Sciences Department of IBM T.J. Watson Research Center, and in 2017 he became Manager of the Center for Optimization, Mathematics, and Algorithms there. In 2017 Schieber became Manager of the Mathematics of AI, IBM Research AI at IBM T.J. Watson Research Center.

In 2018 he joined the New Jersey Institute of Technology as a professor and chair of the Department of Computer Science (until June 2022). In July 2022 he became Director of the Institute for Future Technologies, a partnership of Ben-Gurion University and NJIT.

Schieber has been an associate editor of ACM Transactions on Algorithms since the inception of the journal in 2004. He was a guest editor of IBM Journal of Research and Development special issue on Business Optimization, and an associate editor of the Journal of Algorithms from 1998 to 2003. He was also a member of the executive board at the Center for Discrete Mathematics and Theoretical Computer Science (DIMACS) until 2018, and continues to serve on its executive committee.

== Research and publications ==
Schieber's research work focuses on algorithms, optimization and business analytics. His work includes the development of fast, provably efficient, approximation algorithms for intractable combinatorial optimization problems. For these problems, which defy exhaustive search solutions, searching for near-optimal solutions is a pragmatic and viable strategy. Schieber considered such intractable business optimization problems in areas like scheduling and network design and devised general techniques for solving them.

Two examples for his techniques are: A unified approach to approximating maximum throughput in resource allocation and scheduling, and a divide-and-conquer approximation paradigm for approximating NP-hard graph optimization problems via Spreading Metrics.

== Honors and awards ==
Schieber is a recipient of the Israel Defense Prize for major technological contributions to Israeli defense systems in 1984. While at IBM he received eight technical achievement awards for various projects.

== Media ==
Schieber's research projects have been featured in major publications, including The New York Times, Forbes, The Economist, Newsweek and more.

== Personal life ==
Schieber is married and has two daughters. They live in White Plains, New York.
