= Tarjan's off-line lowest common ancestors algorithm =

Algorithm in graph theory

In computer science, Tarjan's off-line lowest common ancestors algorithm is an algorithm for computing lowest common ancestors for pairs of nodes in a tree, based on the union-find data structure. The lowest common ancestor of two nodes d and e in a rooted tree T is the node g that is an ancestor of both d and e and that has the greatest depth in T. It is named after Robert Tarjan, who discovered the technique in 1979. Tarjan's algorithm is an offline algorithm; that is, unlike other lowest common ancestor algorithms, it requires that all pairs of nodes for which the lowest common ancestor is desired must be specified in advance. The simplest version of the algorithm uses the union-find data structure, which unlike other lowest common ancestor data structures can take more than constant time per operation when the number of pairs of nodes is similar in magnitude to the number of nodes. A later refinement by Gabow & Tarjan (1983) speeds the algorithm up to linear time.

== Pseudocode ==
The pseudocode below determines the lowest common ancestor of each pair in P, given the root r of a tree in which the children of node n are in the set n.children. For this offline algorithm, the set P must be specified in advance. It uses the MakeSet, Find, and Union functions of a disjoint-set data structure. MakeSet(u) removes u to a singleton set, Find(u) returns the standard representative of the set containing u, and Union(u,v) merges the set containing u with the set containing v. TarjanOLCA(r) is first called on the root r.

function TarjanOLCA(u) is
    MakeSet(u)
    u.ancestor := u
    for each v in u.children do
        TarjanOLCA(v)
        Union(u, v)
        Find(u).ancestor := u
    u.color := black
    for each v such that {u, v} in P do
        if v.color == black then
            print "Tarjan's Lowest Common Ancestor of " + u +
                  " and " + v + " is " + Find(v).ancestor + "."

Each node is initially white, and is colored black after it and all its children have been visited.

For each node pair {u,v} to be investigated:

- When v is already black (viz. when v comes before u in a post-order traversal of the tree): After u is colored black, the lowest common ancestor of this pair is available as Find(v).ancestor, but only while the LCA of u and v is not colored black.
- Otherwise: Once v is colored black, the LCA will be available as Find(u).ancestor, while the LCA is not colored black.

According to Tarjan (1979) the time complexity is O((m + n)a(m + n, n)), where m is the number of edges and n the number of vertices and a is the inverse Ackerman function, provided that the time to find the vertex pairs corresponding to u takes constant time per vertex. The paper recommends using an adjacency list (called adjacency structure in the paper).

For reference, here are optimized versions of MakeSet, Find, and Union for a disjoint-set forest:

function MakeSet(x) is
    x.parent := x
    x.rank   := 1
 
function Union(x, y) is
    xRoot := Find(x)
    yRoot := Find(y)
    if xRoot.rank > yRoot.rank then
        yRoot.parent := xRoot
    else if xRoot.rank < yRoot.rank then
        xRoot.parent := yRoot
    else if xRoot.rank == yRoot.rank then
        yRoot.parent := xRoot
        xRoot.rank := xRoot.rank + 1
  
function Find(x) is
    if x.parent != x then
       x.parent := Find(x.parent)
    return x.parent

== Speeding up the algorithm ==
It is possible to preprocess the input LCA queries in such a manner, that the algorithm works faster by an order of magnitude.

function Preprocess(P) is
   m := empty map
   for each {u, v} in P do
       if u is not mapped in m
           m[u] := ∅
       m[u] := m[u] ∪ {(u, v)}
       if v is not mapped in m
           m[v] := ∅
       m[v] := m[v] ∪ {(u, v)}
   return m

function GetOpposite(q, u) is
   if q[0] == u then
       return q[1]
   return q[0]    

function FasterTarjanOLCA(u, m) is
   MakeSet(u)
   u.ancestor := u
   for each v in u.children do
       FasterTarjanOLCA(v)
       Union(u, v)
       Find(u).ancestor := u
   u.color := black
   if m[u] == nil then
       return
   for each q in m[u] do
       v := GetOpposite(q, u)
       if v != nil and v.color == black then
           print "LCA of " + u + " and " + v + " is " + Find(v).ancestor + "."

The idea in the optimization is associating nodes with their counterparts in the list of input queries.
