= Stooge =

A stooge or stooges may refer to:

- Straight man, a comedian who feeds lines to another
- Shill, a confederate or performer who acts as if they are a spectator
- The Stooge, a 1952 American film
- The Three Stooges, a comedy group from the 1930s to the 1970s
  - The Three Stooges (2012 film), a film based on the comedy team
- The Stooges, a late-1960s and early-1970s rock band
  - The Stooges (album), their debut album
- Fuj the Stooge, nickname of 1980s wrestling manager Mr. Fuji given to him by his former protégé Demolition
- Stooges Brass Band, a New Orleans brass band
- Stooge sort, a recursive sorting algorithm in computer software
