= Sorting =

Action of arranging objects into order

Sorting refers to ordering data in an increasing or decreasing manner according to some linear relationship among the data items.

1. ordering: arranging items in a sequence ordered by some criterion;
2. categorizing: grouping items with similar properties.

Ordering items is the combination of categorizing them based on equivalent order, and ordering the categories themselves.

== By type ==
=== Information or data ===
In computer science, arranging in an ordered sequence is called "sorting". Sorting is a common operation in many applications, and efficient algorithms have been developed to perform it.

The most common uses of sorted sequences are:

- making lookup or search efficient;
- making merging of sequences efficient;
- enabling processing of data in a defined order.

The opposite of sorting, rearranging a sequence of items in a random or meaningless order, is called shuffling.

For sorting, either a weak order, "should not come after", can be specified, or a strict weak order, "should come before" (specifying one defines also the other, the two are the complement of the inverse of each other, see operations on binary relations). For the sorting to be unique, these two are restricted to a total order and a strict total order, respectively.

Sorting n-tuples (depending on context also called e.g. records consisting of fields) can be done based on one or more of its components. More generally objects can be sorted based on a property. Such a component or property is called a sort key.

For example, the items are books, the sort key is the title, subject or author, and the order is alphabetical.

A new sort key can be created from two or more sort keys by lexicographical order. The first is then called the primary sort key, the second the secondary sort key, etc.

For example, addresses could be sorted using the city as primary sort key, and the street as secondary sort key.

If the sort key values are totally ordered, the sort key defines a weak order of the items: items with the same sort key are equivalent with respect to sorting. See also stable sorting. If different items have different sort key values then this defines a unique order of the items.

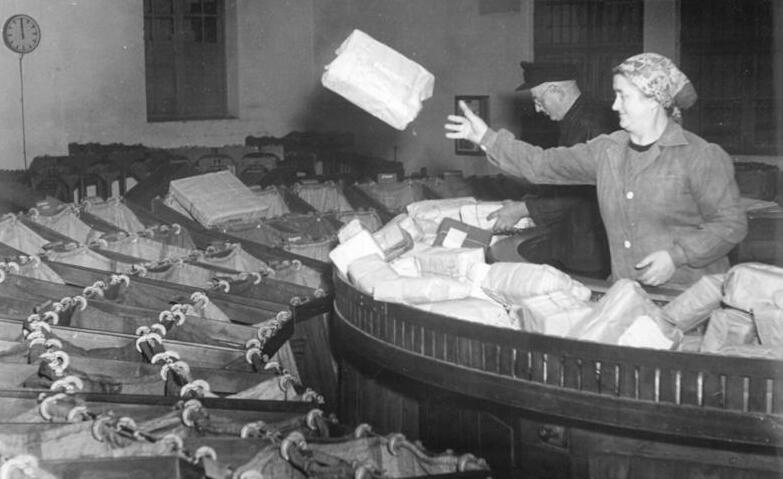
Workers sorting parcels in a postal facility

A standard order is often called ascending (corresponding to the fact that the standard order of numbers is ascending, i.e. A to Z, 0 to 9), the reverse order descending (Z to A, 9 to 0). For dates and times, ascending means that earlier values precede later ones e.g. 1/1/2000 will sort ahead of 1/1/2001.

==== Common algorithms ====
- Bubble/Shell sort: Exchange two adjacent elements if they are out of order. Repeat until array is sorted.
- Insertion sort: Scan successive elements for an out-of-order item, then insert the item in the proper place.
- Selection sort: Find the smallest (or biggest) element in the array, and put it in the proper place. Swap it with the value in the first position. Repeat until array is sorted.
- Quick sort: Partition the array into two segments. In the first segment, all elements are less than or equal to the pivot value. In the second segment, all elements are greater than or equal to the pivot value. Finally, sort the two segments recursively.
- Merge sort: Divide the list of elements in two parts, sort the two parts individually and then merge it.

=== Physical ===
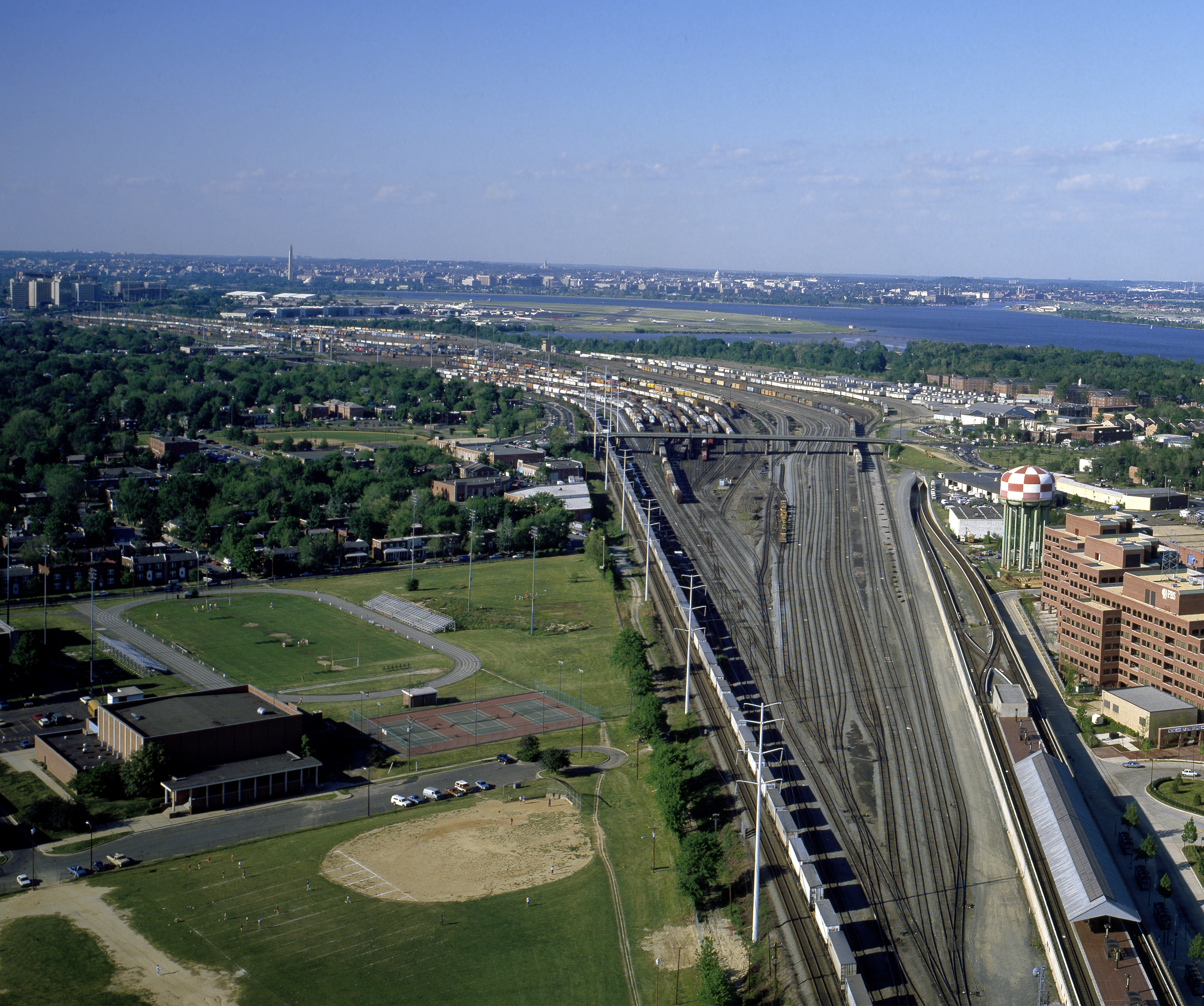
A railroad classification yard, used for sorting freight cars

Various sorting tasks are essential in industrial processes, such as mineral processing. For example, during the extraction of gold from ore, a device called a shaker table uses gravity, vibration, and flow to separate gold from lighter materials in the ore (sorting by size and weight). Sorting is also a naturally occurring process that results in the concentration of ore or sediment. Sorting results from the application of some criterion or differential stressors to a mass to separate it into its components based on some variable quality. Materials that are different, but only slightly so, such as the isotopes of uranium, are very difficult to separate.

Optical sorting is an automated process of sorting solid products using cameras and/or lasers and has widespread use in the food industry. Sensor-based sorting is used in mineral processing.

== See also ==
- Help:Sorting in Wikipedia tables. For sorting of categories, see Wikipedia:Categorization#Sort keys and for sorting of article sections, see WP:ORDER
- Collation
- Data processing
- IBM mainframe sort/merge
- Unicode collation algorithm
- Knolling
- 5S (methodology)
