= Computing performance =

Computing performance can mean:

- Algorithmic efficiency (software)
- Computer performance (hardware)
