= Cubesort =

Array sorting algorithm

- Class: Sorting algorithm
- Data structure: Array
- Worst-case performance: O(n log n)
- Worst-case space complexity: Θ(n)
- Optimal: ?

Cubesort is a parallel sorting algorithm that builds a self-balancing multi-dimensional array from the keys to be sorted. As the axes are of similar length the structure resembles a cube. After each key is inserted the cube can be rapidly converted to an array.

A cubesort implementation written in C was published in 2014.

== Operation ==
Cubesort's algorithm uses a specialized binary search on each axis to find the location to insert an element. When an axis grows too large it is split. Locality of reference is optimal as only four binary searches are performed on small arrays for each insertion. By using many small dynamic arrays the high cost for insertion on single large arrays is avoided.
