= Stooge sort =

Inefficient recursive sorting algorithm

- Visualization of Stooge sort (only shows swaps)
- Class: Sorting algorithm
- Data structure: Array
- Worst-case performance: $O(n^{\log 3/\log 1.5})$
- Worst-case space complexity: $O(\log n)$

Stooge sort is a recursive sorting algorithm. It is notable for its exceptionally poor time complexity of $O(n^{\log 3/\log 1.5})$ = $O(n^{2.7095...})$ The algorithm's running time is thus slower compared to reasonable sorting algorithms, and is slower than bubble sort, a canonical example of a fairly inefficient sort. It is, however, more efficient than Slowsort. The name comes from The Three Stooges.

The algorithm is defined as follows:

- If the value at the start is larger than the value at the end, swap them.
- If there are three or more elements in the list, then:
  - Stooge sort the initial 2/3 of the list
  - Stooge sort the final 2/3 of the list
  - Stooge sort the initial 2/3 of the list again

It is important to get the integer sort size used in the recursive calls by rounding the 2/3 upwards, e.g. rounding 2/3 of 5 should give 4 rather than 3, as otherwise the sort can fail on certain data.

== Implementation ==
=== Pseudocode ===
 function stoogesort(array L, i = 0, j = length(L)-1){
     if L[i] > L[j] then       // If the leftmost element is larger than the rightmost element
         swap(L[i],L[j])       // Then swap them
     if (j - i + 1) > 2 then   // If there are at least 3 elements in the array
         t = floor((j - i + 1) / 3)
         stoogesort(L, i, j-t) // Sort the first 2/3 of the array
         stoogesort(L, i+t, j) // Sort the last 2/3 of the array
         stoogesort(L, i, j-t) // Sort the first 2/3 of the array again
     return L
 }
