= Strand sort =

Sorting algorithm

Strand Sort Animation

Strand sort is a recursive sorting algorithm that sorts items of a list into increasing order. It has O(n^{2}) worst-case time complexity, which occurs when the input list is reverse sorted. It has a best-case time complexity of O(n), which occurs when the input is already sorted.

The algorithm first moves the first element of a list into a sub-list. It then compares the last element in the sub-list to each subsequent element in the original list. Once there is an element in the original list that is greater than the last element in the sub-list, the element is removed from the original list and added to the sub-list. This process continues until the last element in the sub-list is compared to the remaining elements in the original list. The sub-list is then merged into a new list. Repeat this process and merge all sub-lists until all elements are sorted. This algorithm is called strand sort because there are strands of sorted elements within the unsorted elements that are removed one at a time. This algorithm is also used in J Sort for fewer than 40 elements.

== Example ==
This example is based on the description of the algorithm provided in the book IT Enabled Practices and Emerging Management Paradigms.

Step 1: Start with a list of numbers: {5, 1, 4, 2, 0, 9, 6, 3, 8, 7}.

Step 2: Next, move the first element of the list into a new sub-list: sub-list contains {5}.

Step 3: Then, iterate through the original list and compare each number to 5 until there is a number greater than 5.

- 1 < 5, so 1 is not added to the sub-list.
- 4 < 5, so 4 is not added to the sub-list.
- 2 < 5, so 2 is not added to the sub-list.
- 0 < 5, so 0 is not added to the sub-list.
- 9 > 5, so 9 is added to the sub-list and removed from the original list.

Step 4: Now compare 9 with the remaining elements in the original list until there is a number greater than 9.

- 6 < 9, so 6 is not added to the sub-list.
- 3 < 9, so 3 is not added to the sub-list.
- 8 < 9, so 8 is not added to the sub-list.
- 7 < 9, so 7 is not added to the sub-list.

Step 5: Now there are no more elements to compare 9 to, so merge the sub-list into a new list, called solution-list.

After step 5, the original list contains {1, 4, 2, 0, 6, 3, 8, 7}.

The sub-list is empty, and the solution list contains {5, 9}.

Step 6: Move the first element of the original list into sub-list: sub-list contains {1}.

Step 7: Iterate through the original list and compare each number to 1 until there is a number greater than 1.

- 4 > 1, so 4 is added to the sub-list and 4 is removed from the original list.

Step 8: Now compare 4 with the remaining elements in the original list until there is a number greater than 4.

- 2 < 4, so 2 is not added to the sub-list.
- 0 < 4, so 0 is not added to the sub-list.
- 6 > 4, so 6 is added to the sub-list and is removed from the original list.

Step 9: Now compare 6 with the remaining elements in the original list until there is a number greater than 6.

- 3 < 6, so 3 is not added to the sub-list.
- 8 > 6, so 8 is added to the sub-list and is removed from the original list.

Step 10: Now compare 8 with the remaining elements in the original list until there is a number greater than 8.

- 7 < 8, so 7 is not added to the sub-list.

Step 11: Since there are no more elements in the original list to compare {8} to, the sub-list is merged with the solution list. Now the original list contains {2, 0, 3, 7}, the sub-list is empty, and the solution-list contains {1, 4, 5, 6, 8, 9}.

Step 12: Move the first element of the original list into sub-list. Sub-list contains {2}.

Step 13: Iterate through the original list and compare each number to 2 until there is a number greater than 2.

- 0 < 2, so 0 is not added to the sub-list.
- 3 > 2, so 3 is added to the sub-list and is removed from the original list.

Step 14: Now compare 3 with the remaining elements in the original list until there is a number greater than 3.

- 7 > 3, so 7 is added to the sub-list and is removed from the original list.

Step 15: Since there are no more elements in the original list to compare {7} to, the sub-list is merged with the solution list. The original list now contains {0}, the sub-list is empty, and solution list contains {1, 2, 3, 4, 5, 6, 7, 8, 9}.

Step 16: Move the first element of the original list into sub-list. Sub-list contains {0}.

Step 17: Since the original list is now empty, the sub-list is merged with the solution list. The solution list now contains {0, 1, 2, 3, 4, 5, 6, 7, 8, 9}. There are now no more elements in the original list, and all of the elements in the solution list have successfully been sorted into increasing numerical order.

== Implementation ==
Since Strand Sort requires many insertions and deletions, it is best to use a linked list when implementing the algorithm. Linked lists require constant time for both insertions and removals of elements using iterators. The time to traverse through the linked list is directly related to the input size of the list. The following implementation is done in Java 8 and is based on the description of the algorithm from the book IT Enabled Practices and Emerging Management Paradigms.

package strandSort;

import java.util.*;

public class strandSort {
	static LinkedList<Integer> solList = new LinkedList<Integer>();
	static int k = 0;

	/**
	 * This is a recursive Strand Sort method. It takes in a linked list of
	 * integers as its parameter. It first checks the base case to see if the
	 * linked list is empty. Then proceeds to the Strand sort algorithm until
	 * the linked list is empty.
	 * 
	 * @param origList:
	 *            a linked list of integers
	 */
	public static void strandSortIterative(LinkedList<Integer> origList) {

		// Base Case
		if (origList.isEmpty()) {
			return;
		}

		else {
			// Create the subList and add the first element of
			// The original linked list to the sublist.
			// Then remove the first element from the original list.
			LinkedList<Integer> subList = new LinkedList<Integer>();
			subList.add(origList.getFirst());
			origList.removeFirst();

			// Iterate through the original list, checking if any elements are
			// Greater than the element in the sub list.
			int index = 0;
			for (int j = 0; j < origList.size(); j++) {
				if (origList.get(j) > subList.get(index)) {
					subList.add(origList.get(j));
					origList.remove(j);
					j = j - 1;
					index = index + 1;
				}
			}
			// Merge sub-list into solution list.
			// There are two cases for this step/
			// Case 1: The first recursive call, add all of the elements to the
			// solution list in sequential order
			if (k == 0) {
				for (int i = 0; i < subList.size(); i++) {

					solList.add(subList.get(i));
					k = k + 1;
				}

			}

			// Case 2: After the first recursive call, 
			// merge the sub-list with the solution list.
			// This works by comparing the greatest element in the sublist (which is always the last element)
			// with the first element in the solution list. 
			else {
				int subEnd = subList.size() - 1;
				int solStart = 0;
				while (!subList.isEmpty()) {

					if (subList.get(subEnd) > solList.get(solStart)) {
						solStart++;

					} else {
						solList.add(solStart, subList.get(subEnd));
						subList.remove(subEnd);
						subEnd--;
						solStart = 0;
					}

				}

			}

			strandSortIterative(origList);
		}

	}

	public static void main(String[] args) {
		// Create a new linked list of Integers
		LinkedList<Integer> origList = new LinkedList<Integer>();

		// Add the following integers to the linked list: {5, 1, 4, 2, 0, 9, 6, 3, 8, 7}

		origList.add(5);
		origList.add(1);
		origList.add(4);
		origList.add(2);
		origList.add(0);
		origList.add(9);
		origList.add(6);
		origList.add(3);
		origList.add(8);
		origList.add(7);

		strandSortIterative(origList);
		// Print out the solution list
		for (int i = 0; i < solList.size(); i++) {
			System.out.println(solList.get(i));
		}

	}

}
