= Multithreading =

Multithreading may refer to:

- Multithreading (computer architecture), in computer hardware
- Multithreading (software), in computer software
