= Sort =

Sort may refer to:

- Sorting, any process of arranging items in sequence or in sets
  - Sorting algorithm, any algorithm for ordering a list of elements
  - Internal sort, the process of sorting data entirely in main storage
  - External sort, the process of sorting data too large to fit in main storage
  - Mainframe sort merge, sort utility for IBM mainframe systems
  - Sort (Unix), which sorts the lines of a file
  - Sort (C++), a function in the C++ Standard Template Library
- SORT (journal), an English-language open-access statistics journal published in Spain
- Sort (mathematical logic), a domain in a many-sorted structure
- Sort (typesetting), a piece of metal type
- Sort, Lleida, a town in Catalonia
- Selective organ targeting, a drug delivery method
- Special Operations Response Team, a tactical unit of the US Federal Bureau of Prisons
- Special Operations Response Teams, specialist ambulance service teams in Britain related to hazardous area response teams
- Strategic Offensive Reductions Treaty, between the US and Russia
- Symantec Operations Readiness Tools, a web-based suite of computer tools
