= Sorted =

Sorted may refer to:

== Film and television ==
- Sorted (film), a 2000 British thriller film
- Sorted (TV series), a 2006 British drama series

== Music ==
- Sorted (The Drones album), 1999
- Sorted! The Best of Love and Rockets, a 2003 album
- Sorted, an album by DJ? Acucrack, 2000

== Other uses ==
- Sorted (magazine), a British Christian men's magazine
- Sorted, a 2020 memoir by Jackson Bird
- Sorting (sediment), term in geology describing the degree of variability in sediment grain size within rocks and deposits

== See also ==
- Sort (disambiguation)
