= Cascade merge sort =

Cascade merge sort is similar to the polyphase merge sort but uses a simpler distribution. The merge is slower than a polyphase merge when there are fewer than six files, but faster when there are more than six.
