= Selective organ targeting =

Drug delivery method

Selective organ targeting (SORT) is a novel approach in the field of targeted drug delivery that systematically engineers multiple classes of lipid nanoparticles (LNPs) to enable targeted delivery of therapeutics to specific organs in the body. The SORT molecule alters tissue tropism by adjusting the composition and physical characteristics of the nanoparticle. Adding a permanently cationic lipid, a permanently anionic lipid, or ionizable amino lipid increases delivery to the lung, spleen, and liver, respectively. SORT LNPs utilize SORT molecules to accurately tune and mediate gene delivery and editing, resulting in predictable and manageable protein synthesis from mRNA in particular organ(s), which can potentially improve the efficacy of drugs while reducing side effects.

== Overview ==
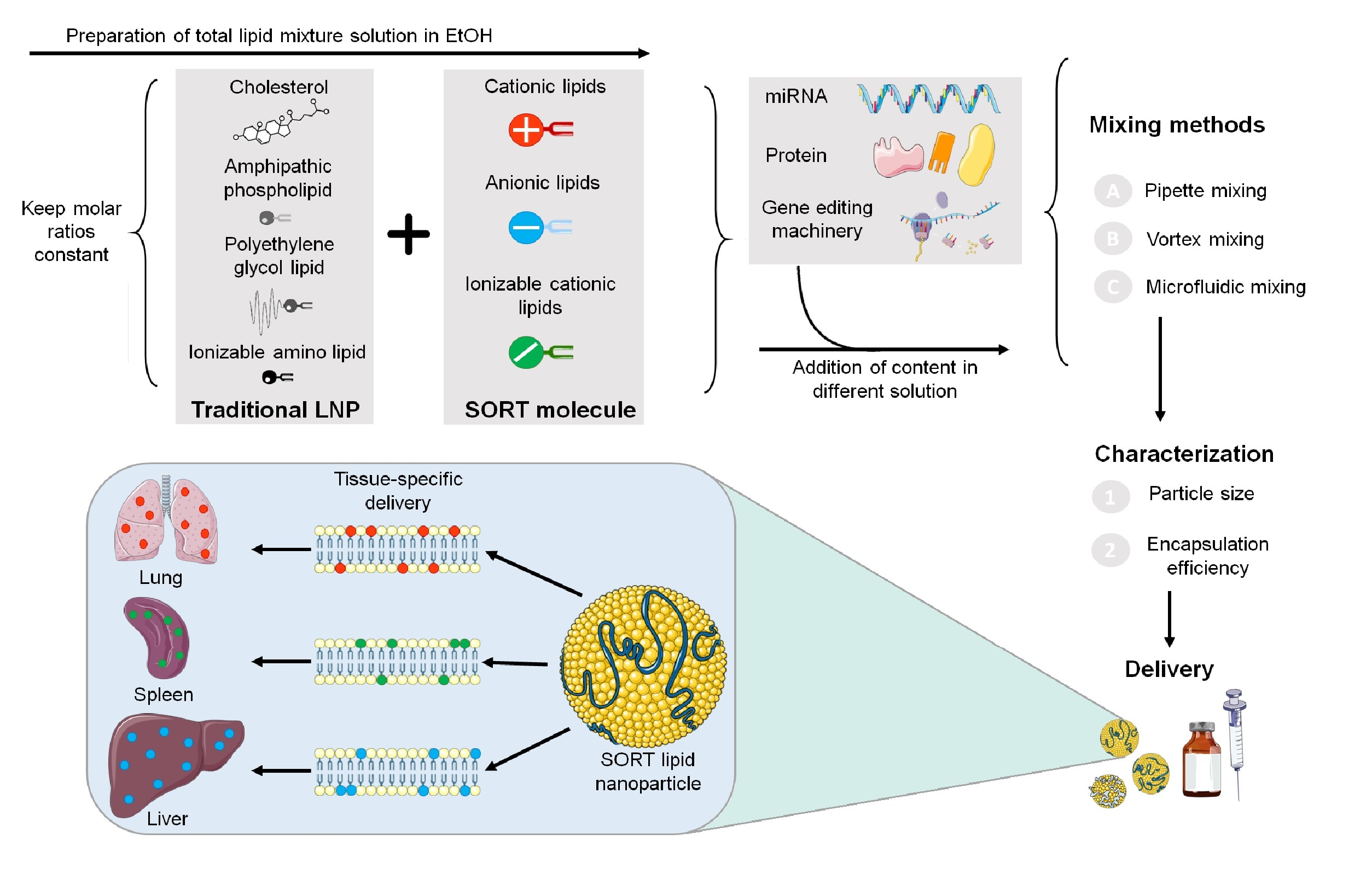
SORT LNPs formulation and targeted delivery. Parts of the figure were drawn by using pictures from Servier Medical Art. Servier Medical Art by Servier is licensed under a Creative Commons Attribution 3.0 Unported License (https://creativecommons.org/licenses/by/3.0/).

LNPs are non-viral synthetic nanoparticles that can carry and deliver different functional molecules to specific tissues. Traditionally, LNPs are composed of four indispensable lipid components: an ionizable amino lipid that aids in both escaping the endosomes and binding nucleic acids to the particle, an amphipathic phospholipid that promotes fusion with the target cell and endosomes, cholesterol to enhance nanoparticle stability, and a polyethylene glycol lipid that improves colloidal stability and reduces clearance of the particle by the reticuloendothelial system.

LNPs have demonstrated safety and effectiveness but are limited to intramuscular and intravenous administration targeting the liver. This limitation largely stems from LNPs' resemblance to very-low-density lipoprotein, leading to a propensity for adsorbing apolipoprotein E (ApoE) present in blood plasma. Consequently, LNPs accumulate in the liver by binding to the low-density lipoprotein receptor found in hepatocytes. SORT LNPs overcome this limitation by augmenting the LNP with an additional component (termed a SORT molecule), allowing delivery to targeted tissues beyond the liver.

== Mechanism ==
Traditionally, LNPs utilize an optimal balance of ionizable amines and nanoparticle-stabilizing hydrophobicity to deliver functional molecules to cells effectively but are limited to liver hepatocytes. In the SORT strategy, these nanoparticles are systematically engineered without altering the molar ratio of the core four components in LNPs, ensuring that the ability to encapsulate RNA and escape from endosomes remains intact. The addition of a SORT molecule alters the biodistribution and redirects the molecules facilitating the uptake in specific organs via endogenous targeting mechanisms of action or by influencing the binding affinity to specific serum proteins.

Tissue tropism is determined by the distinct chemical functional groups present on the surface of the nanoparticle, which alter the physicochemical properties of the LNP. These properties encompass factors such as molarity, percentage added, and various other characteristics. The critical factor that governs tissue tropism is the modulation of the surface's acid dissociation constant (pKa), which corresponds to the pH at which the proportion of charged and uncharged ionizable lipids at the particle's surface is equal and depends on the type of ionizable lipids and charged helper lipids used in the nanoparticle formulation.

The shift from liver tissues is attributed to the alteration in the surface pKa induced by the addition of an anionic head group, which subsequently reduced the strength of interactions with ApoE. Change in surface pKa promotes the adsorption of plasma proteins such as β2- glycoprotein I (β2-GPI) instead of ApoE, resulting in altered protein corona that mediates tissue-specific delivery towards the spleen and lung. Adding a cationic quaternary amino lipid, such as 1,2-dioleoyl-3-trimethylammonium-propane (DOTAP), in an increasing molar percentage, was able to shift the distribution progressively from the liver to spleen and then the lung, with a threshold that allowed for exclusive lung delivery. Negatively charged SORT lipids allow for direct delivery to the spleen.

== Synthesis of SORT LNPs ==
To prepare self-assembled SORT LNPs, the lipids are mixed in ethanol to create a dissolved lipid mixture solution, ensuring that the initial relative molar ratios of the four fundamental components remain unaltered. mRNA is dissolved in citrate buffer separately. To encourage that uniform LNPs are formed, it is necessary to rapidly mix both solutions: the lipid solution containing all lipids and the buffer solution containing mRNA. By employing high-speed mixing, the environmental polarity is enhanced, facilitating the formation of homogenous LNPs. Mixing methods include pipetting, vortex or microfluidic mixing. After mixing, characterize SORT LNPs to measure the particle size and encapsulation efficiency and proceed to delivery into the organism. Delivery can be intrathecal, intravenous, intramuscular or through nebulization.

== Applications ==
SORT LNPs can mediate therapeutically relevant protein production levels and safely deliver proteins to specific tissues and even particular cell populations. The tissue specificity occurs quickly and is not dependent on time. Further benefits of SORT LNPs include formulation stability and conservation of physiochemical properties over time, including a maintained in vivo efficacy after storage at 4 degrees Celsius. LNPs, in general, are well tolerated in mice and humans, and no alterations in kidney and liver function or alteration of serum proteins have been found in studies with murine models evaluating in vivo toxicity.

SORT has the potential to revolutionize drug delivery by improving the efficacy and pharmacokinetics of drugs while reducing side effects. SORT molecules can reach deep tissues that were previously inaccessible for treatment, enhancing tissue penetration. This holds significant promise in benefiting a wide range of genetic disorders, enabling advancements in protein replacement therapy and gene editing, as this strategy allows for gene editing without local administration.

The benefits of targeted delivery of protein products or gene editing machinery to the liver are shown in genetic diseases affecting the liver or in which the altered gene product is produced in the liver, such as tyrosinemia, and transthyretin amyloidosis, respectively, and the addition of a SORT molecule has been shown further improve liver-targeting LNP systems further.

However, the SORT strategy could potentially extrapolate these benefits to other organs. One promising target for gene editing is cystic fibrosis, as a tailored therapy with an effective delivery system could significantly rescue CFTR expression. Other possible applications include restoration of gene expression in other organs, such as restoring dystrophin expression in muscle for Duchenne muscular dystrophy. Targeted approaches for bone marrow and brain tropism are currently in development

One of the most promising applications of SORT is cancer treatment. By targeting the cancerous cells in a specific organ, SORT may be able to deliver drugs or gene therapies directly to the cancerous cells while sparing the healthy cells in other organs. Selectivity for the spleen could also be applicable in treating cancer via chimeric antigen receptor (CAR)-T cell therapy and opens a new path for developing in vivo T-cell targeted mRNA delivery systems able to induce robust and transient CAR expression.

There are promising applications in the combination of SORT and different delivery methods besides intravenous administration, such as nebulization, intrathecal or intramuscular administration, as these will deliver the SORT molecules directed to targeted organs and further reduce systemic exposure.

Additionally, SORT technology is applicable to several classes of established four-component LNPs, and various non-lipid nanoparticle components. This broadens the spectrum of its applications and enables the delivery of diverse therapeutics, encompassing not only nucleic acids but also single or multiple proteins, and even entire genome editors.

== Limitations ==
At present, the SORT strategy is capable of achieving targeted delivery exclusively to specific organs such as the liver, lungs, and spleen. Establishing the SORT LNP formulation is a fine-tuning process, as some concentrations of SORT molecules may aid in delivery to other organs, whereas different concentrations completely select delivery to another organ. However, this fine-tuning mechanism is limited as it can also alter the molecule's activity and render it ineffective. Moreover, it is difficult to accurately predict the biodistribution of LNPs based on their physicochemical parameters, and biodistribution alone cannot predict mRNA-induced protein expression in a specific tissue. There is no indication that a massive accumulation of LNPs in a given tissue will necessarily lead to a high degree of protein expression in the targeted cells

== See also ==
- Personalized medicine
- Solid lipid nanoparticle
- Targeted drug delivery
- Targeted therapy
