= Q sort =

Q sort or Qsort may refer to:

== Computing ==
- Quicksort
- qsort

== Psychology ==
- Q methodology
