= Law of trichotomy =

Law (all real numbers are positive, negative, or 0)

In mathematics, the law of trichotomy states that every real number is either positive, negative, or zero.

More generally, a binary relation R on a set X is trichotomous if for all x and y in X, exactly one of xRy, yRx and x = y holds. Writing R as <, this is stated in formal logic as:

$$\forall x \in X \, \forall y \in X \, (
[       x < y  \, \land \, \lnot(y < x) \, \land \, \lnot(x = y) ] \, \lor \,
[ \lnot(x < y) \, \land \,       y < x  \, \land \, \lnot(x = y) ] \, \lor \,
[ \lnot(x < y) \, \land \, \lnot(y < x) \, \land \,       x = y  ]
) \,.$$

With this definition, the law of trichotomy states that < is a trichotomous relation on the set of real numbers. In other words, if x and y are real numbers, then exactly one of the following must be true: x<y, x=y, y<x.

== Properties ==
- A relation is trichotomous if, and only if, it is asymmetric and connected.
- If a trichotomous relation is also transitive, then it is a strict total order; this is a special case of a strict weak order.

== Examples ==
- On the set X = {a,b,c}, the relation R = { (a,b), (a,c), (b,c) } is transitive and trichotomous, and hence a strict total order.
- On the same set, the cyclic relation R = { (a,b), (b,c), (c,a) } is trichotomous, but not transitive; it is even antitransitive.

== Trichotomy on numbers ==
A law of trichotomy on some set X of numbers usually expresses that some tacitly given ordering relation on X is a trichotomous one. An example is the law "For arbitrary real numbers x and y, exactly one of x < y, y < x, or x = y applies". (Some authors fix y to be zero, relying on the real number's linearly ordered group structure for addition.

In classical logic, this axiom of trichotomy holds for ordinary comparisons between real numbers and therefore also for comparisons between integers and between rational numbers. The law does not hold in general in intuitionistic logic.

In Zermelo–Fraenkel set theory and Bernays set theory, the law of trichotomy holds for the cardinal numbers of well-orderable sets, but not necessarily for all cardinal numbers. If the axiom of choice holds, then trichotomy holds between arbitrary cardinal numbers (because they are all well-orderable in that case).

== See also ==
- Begriffsschrift contains an early formulation of the law of trichotomy
- Dichotomy
- Law of noncontradiction
- Law of excluded middle
- Three-way comparison
