= Paul Gustav Heinrich Bachmann =

German mathematician (1837–1920)

- Born: 22 June 1837; Berlin, Germany
- Died: 31 March 1920 (aged 82); Weimar, Germany
- Scientific career
- Fields: Mathematics

Paul Gustav Heinrich Bachmann (22 June 1837 – 31 March 1920) was a German mathematician.

== Life ==
Bachmann studied mathematics at the university of his native city of Berlin and received his doctorate in 1862 for his thesis on group theory. He then went to Breslau to study for his habilitation, which he received in 1864 for his thesis on Complex Units. He was a professor at Breslau and later at Münster.

== Works ==
- Zahlentheorie, Bachmann's work on number theory in five volumes (1872-1923):
  - Vol. I: Die Elemente der Zahlentheorie (1892)
  - Vol. II: Analytische Zahlentheorie (1894), a work on analytic number theory in which Big O notation was first introduced
  - Vol. III: Die Lehre von der Kreistheilung und ihre Beziehungen zur Zahlentheorie (first published in 1872)
  - Vol. IV (Part 1): Die Arithmetik der quadratischen Formen (1898)
  - Vol. IV (Part 2): Die Arithmetik der quadratischen Formen (posthumously published in 1923)
  - Vol. V: Allgemeine Arithmetik der Zahlenkörper (1905)
- Niedere Zahlentheorie: First part (1902), Second part (1910), a two-volume work on elementary number theory
- Das Fermat-Problem in seiner bisherigen Entwicklung, a work about Fermat's Last Theorem

Bachmann introduced the Big O notation, which was later popularized by Edmund Landau.
