= Asymptotic computational complexity =

Measurement of computational complexity

In computational complexity theory, asymptotic computational complexity is the use of asymptotic analysis for the estimation of the computational complexity of algorithms and computational problems, commonly associated with the use of the big O notation.

== Scope ==
With respect to computational resources, asymptotic time complexity and asymptotic space complexity of computational algorithms and programs are commonly estimated. Other asymptotically estimated behavior include circuit complexity and various measures of parallel computation, such as the number of (parallel) processors.

Since the ground-breaking 1965 paper by Juris Hartmanis and Richard E. Stearns and the 1979 book by Michael Garey and David S. Johnson on NP-completeness, the term "computational complexity" (of algorithms) has become commonly used to refer to asymptotic computational complexity.

Further, unless specified otherwise, the term "computational complexity" usually refers to an upper bound for the asymptotic computational complexity of an algorithm or a problem, which is usually written in terms of the big O notation, e.g. $O(n^3).$ Other types of (asymptotic) computational complexity estimates are lower bounds ("big omega" notation; e.g., Ω(n)) and asymptotically tight estimates, when the asymptotic upper and lower bounds coincide (written using the "big theta"; e.g., Θ(n log n)).

A further tacit assumption is that the worst-case complexity is in question unless stated otherwise. An alternative approach is probabilistic analysis of algorithms.

== Types of algorithms considered ==
In most practical cases deterministic algorithms or randomized algorithms are discussed, although theoretical computer science also considers nondeterministic algorithms and other advanced models of computation.

== See also ==
- Asymptotically optimal algorithm
