= Qsort =

Standard library function in the C programming language

qsort is a C standard library function that implements a sorting algorithm for arrays of arbitrary objects according to a user-provided comparison function. It is named after the "quicker sort" algorithm (a quicksort variant due to R. S. Scowen), which was originally used to implement it in the Unix C library, although the C standard does not require it to implement quicksort. It comes from <stdlib.h> (or <cstdlib> in C++ Standard Library).

The ability to operate on different kinds of data (polymorphism) is achieved by taking a function pointer to a three-way comparison function, as well as a parameter that specifies the size of its individual input objects. The C standard requires the comparison function to implement a total order on the items in the input array.

== History ==
A qsort function appears in Version 2 Unix in 1972 as a library assembly language subroutine. Its interface is unlike the modern version, in that it can be pseudo-prototyped as void qsort(void* start, void* end, unsigned int length) – sorting contiguously-stored length-long byte strings from the range [start, end). This, and the lack of a replaceable comparison function, makes it unsuitable to properly sort the system's little-endian integers, or any other data structures.

In Version 3 Unix, the interface is extended by calling compar(III), with an interface identical to modern-day memcmp. This function may be overridden by the user's program to implement any kind of ordering, in an equivalent fashion to the compar argument to standard qsort (though program-global, of course).

Version 4 Unix adds a C implementation, with an interface equivalent to the standard. It was rewritten in 1983 for the Berkeley Software Distribution. The function was standardized in ANSI C (1989). The assembly implementation is removed in Version 6 Unix.

In 1991, Bell Labs employees observed that AT&T and BSD versions of qsort would consume quadratic time for some simple inputs. Thus Jon Bentley and Douglas McIlroy engineered a new faster and more robust implementation. McIlroy would later produce a more complex quadratic-time input, termed AntiQuicksort, in 1998. This function constructs adversarial data on-the-fly.

== Example ==
The following piece of C code shows how to sort a list of integers using qsort.

#include <stdlib.h>

// Comparison function. Receives two generic (void) pointers to the items under comparison.
int compareInts(const void* p, const void* q) {
    int x = *(const int*)p;
    int y = *(const int*)q;

    // Avoid returning x - y, which can cause undefined behaviour
    // because of signed integer overflow.
    if (x < y) {
        // Return -1 for ascending, +1 for descending order. 
        return -1;
    } else if (x > y) {
        // Return +1 for ascending, -1 for descending order.
        return 1;
    } else {
        return 0;
    }
}

// This could be more concisely written as:
int compareInts(const void* p, const void* q) {
    int x = *(const int*)p;
    int y = *(const int*)q;

    return (x > y) - (x < y);
}

// Sort an array of n integers, pointed to by a.
void sortInts(int* a, size_t n) {
    qsort(a, n, sizeof(*a), compareInts);
}

== Extensions ==
Since the comparison function of the original qsort only accepts two pointers, passing in additional parameters (e.g. producing a comparison function that compares by the two value's difference with another value) must be done using global variables. The issue was solved by the BSD and GNU Unix-like systems by introducing a qsort_r function, which allows for an additional parameter to be passed to the comparison function. The two versions of qsort_r have different argument orders. C11 Annex K defines a qsort_s essentially identical to GNU's qsort_r. The macOS and FreeBSD libcs also contain qsort_b, a variant that uses blocks, an analogue to closures, as an alternate solution to the same problem.

In C++, it is faster to use std::sort (or std::ranges::sort from C++20 and onwards). Compared to ::qsort, the templated std::sort is more type-safe since it does not require access to data items through unsafe void pointers, as ::qsort does. Also, ::qsort accesses the comparison function using a function pointer, necessitating large numbers of repeated function calls, whereas in std::sort, comparison functions may be inlined into the custom object code generated for a template instantiation. In practice, C++ code using std::sort is often considerably faster at sorting simple data like integers than equivalent C code using ::qsort.
