= Punched card sorter =

Machine for sorting decks of punched cards

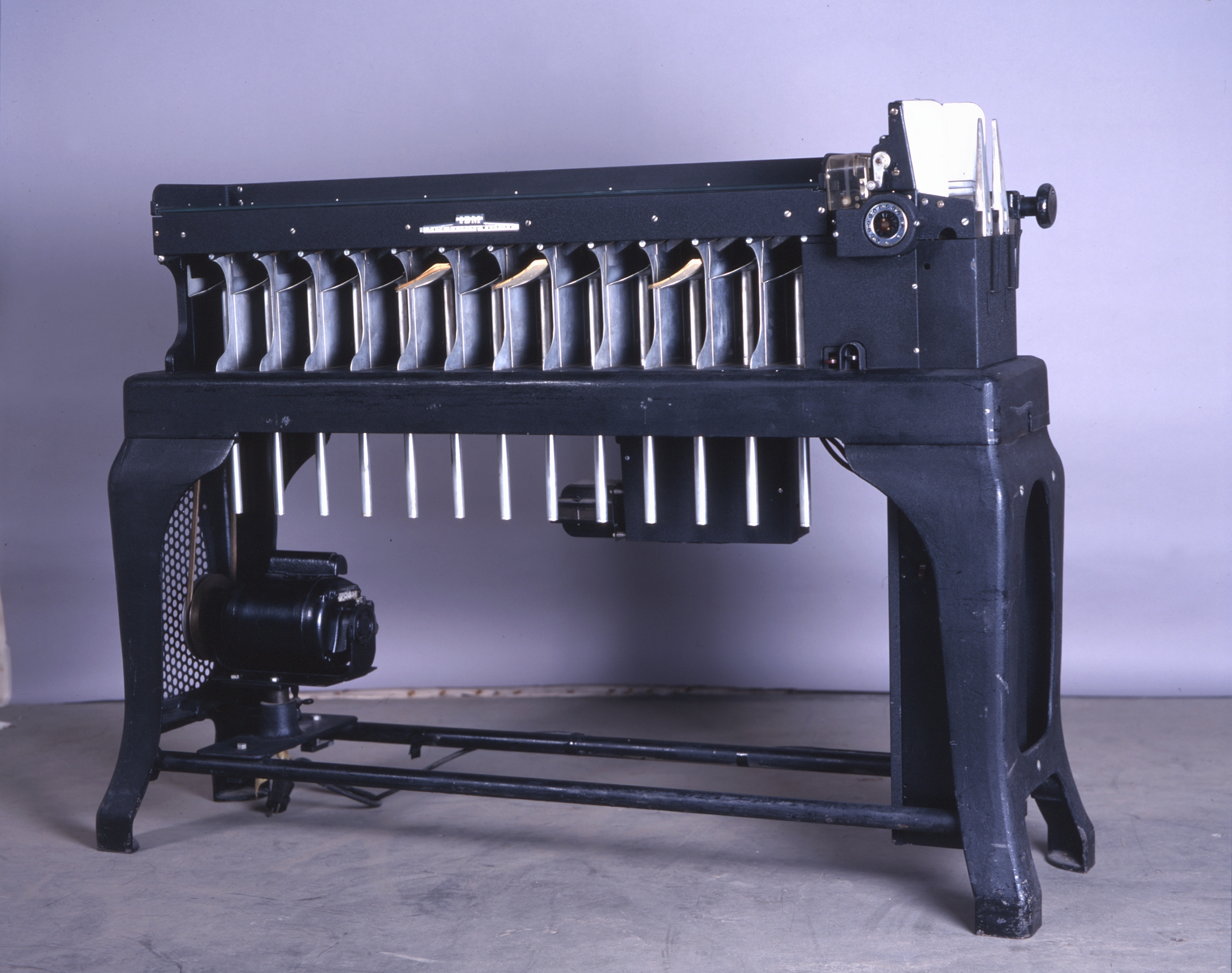
IBM 080 Card Sorter

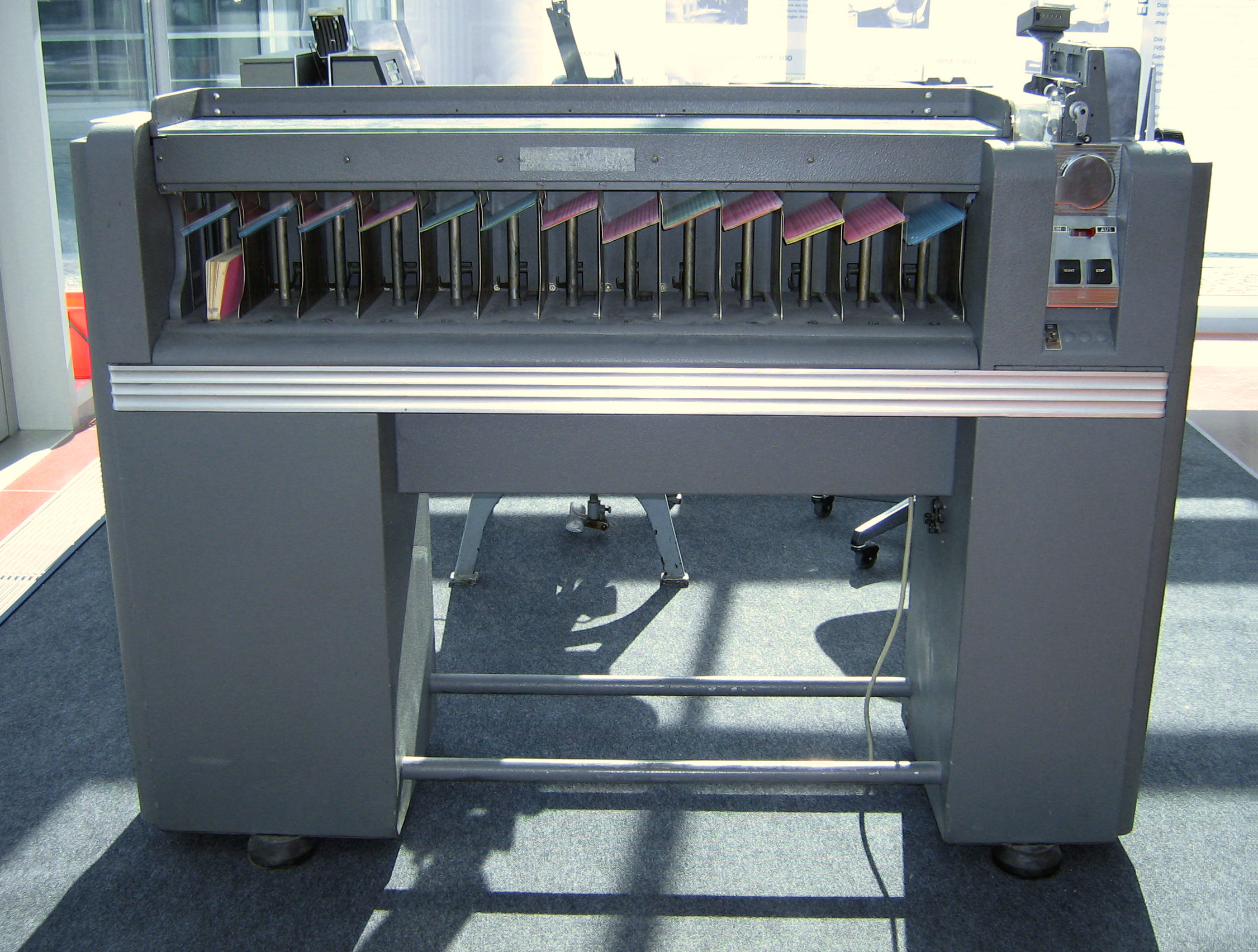
IBM 082 Card Sorter

A punched card sorter is a machine for sorting decks of punched cards.

Sorting was a major activity in most facilities that processed data on punched cards using unit record equipment. The work flow of many processes required decks of cards to be put into some specific order as determined by the data punched in the cards. The same deck might be sorted differently for different processing steps. A popular family of sorters, the IBM 80 series sorters, sorted input cards into one of 13 pockets depending on the holes punched in a selected column and the sorter's settings.

== Basic operation ==
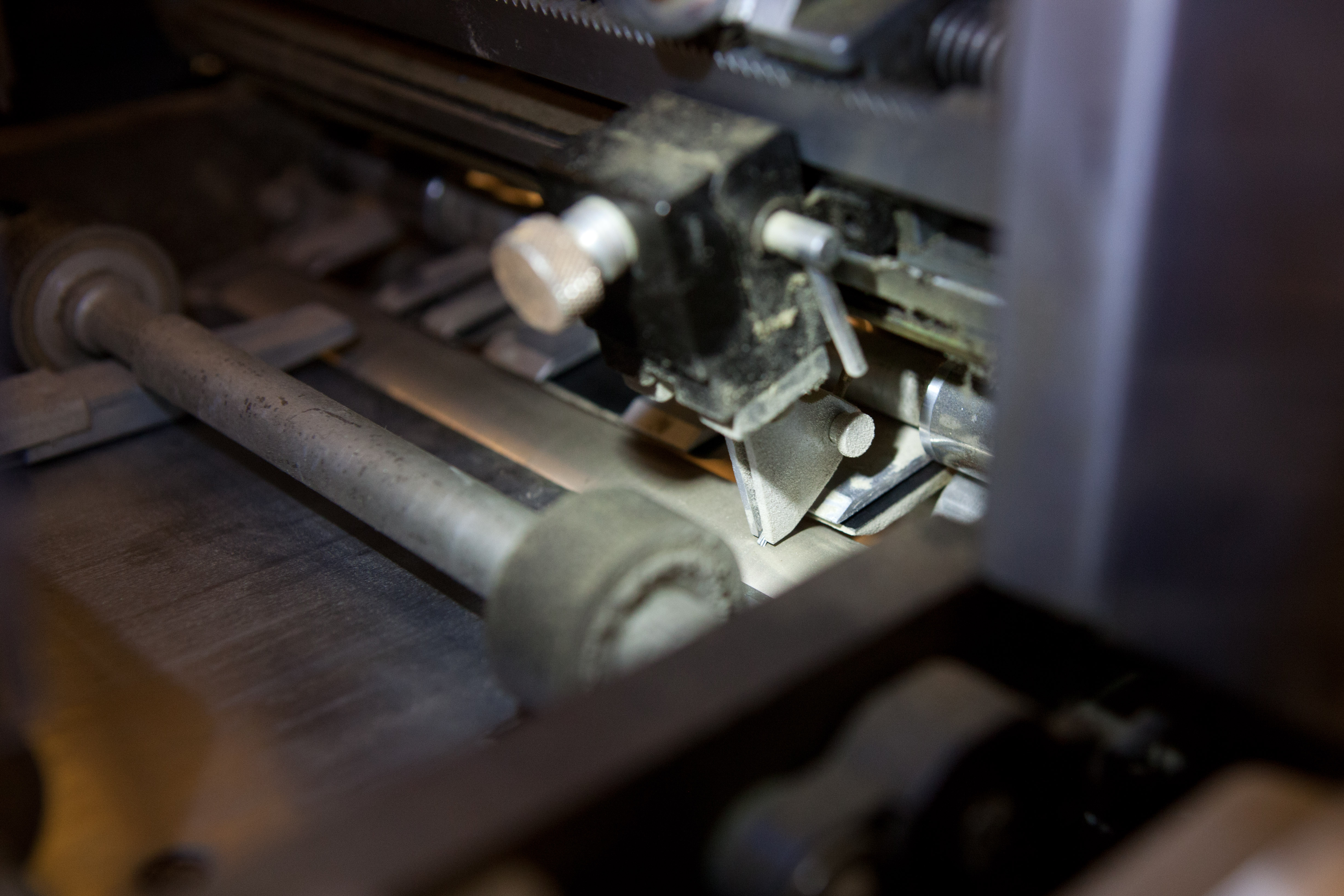
Reader brush on an IBM 83 card sorter

The basic operation of a card sorter is to take a punched card, examine a single column, and place the card into a selected pocket. There are twelve rows on a punched card, and thirteen pockets in the sorter; one pocket is for blanks, rejects, and errors. (IBM 1962)

Cards are normally passed through the sorter face down with the bottom edge ("9-edge") first. A small metal brush or optical sensor is positioned so that, as each card goes through the sorter, one column passes under the brush or optical sensor. The holes sensed in that column together with the settings of the sorter controls determine which pocket the card is to be directed to. This directing is done by slipping the card into a stack of metal strips (or chute blades) that run the length of the sorter feed mechanism. Each blade ends above one of the output pockets, and the card is thus routed to the designated pocket.

== Sorting operations ==
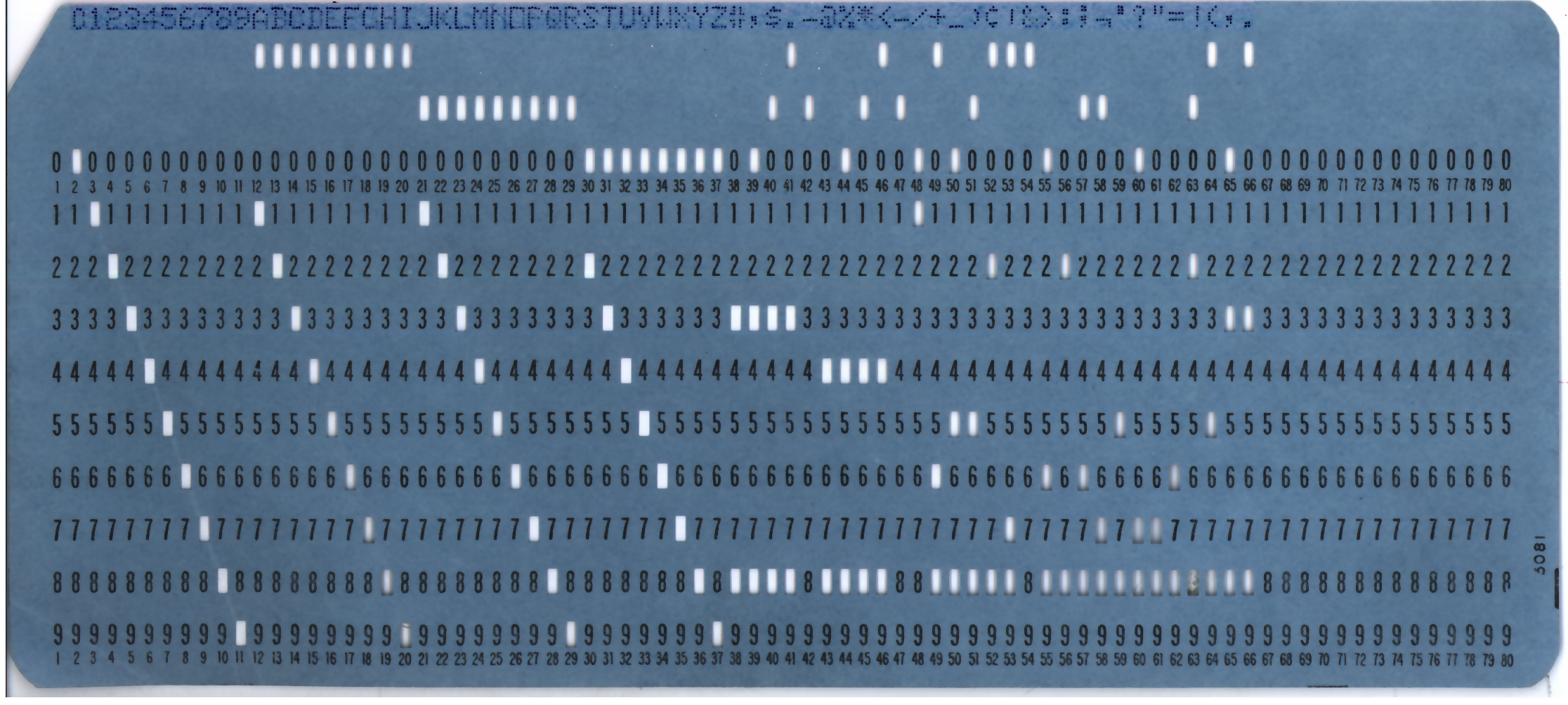
Punched card showing character coding

Multiple column sorting was commonly done by first sorting the least significant column, then proceeding, column by column, to the most significant column. This is called a least significant digit radix sort.

Numeric columns have one punch in rows 0–9, possibly a sign overpunch in rows 11–12, and can be sorted in a single pass through the sorter. Alphabetic columns have a zone punch in rows 12, 11, or 0 and a digit punch in one of the rows 1–9, and can be sorted by passing some or all of the cards through the sorter twice on that column. For more details of punched card codes see punched card#IBM 80-column format and character codes.

Several methods were used for alphabetical sorting, depending on the features provided by the particular sorter and the characteristics of the data to be sorted. A commonly used method on the 082 and earlier sorters was to sort the cards twice on the same column, first on digit rows 1–9, and then (after re-stacking) on the zone rows 12, 11, and 0. Operator switches allow zone-sorting by "switching off" rows 1-9 for the second pass of the card for each column.

Other special characters and punctuation marks were added to the card code, involving as many as three punches per column (and in 1964 with the introduction of EBCDIC as many as six punches per column). The 083 and 084 sorters recognized these multiple-digit or multiple-zone punches, sorting them to the error pocket.

== Earlier sorters ==
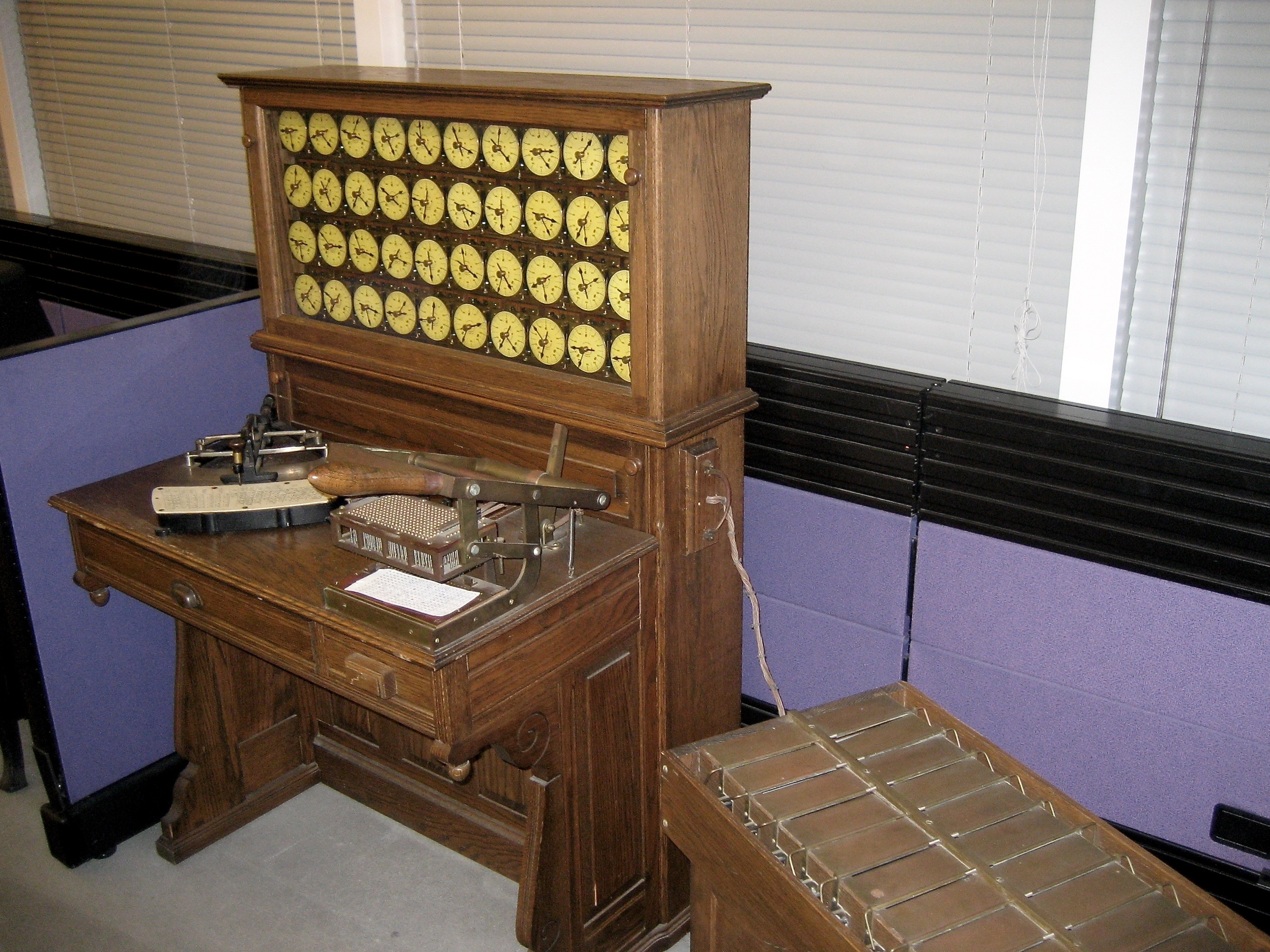
Replica of Hollerith tabulating machine with sorting box, circa 1890. The "sorting box" was an adjunct to, and controlled by, the tabulator. The "sorter", an independent machine, was a later development.

Original census sorting box, 1890, manual.

Sorting cards became an issue during the 1900 agricultural census, so Herman Hollerith's company developed the 1901 Hollerith Automatic Horizontal Sorter, a sorter with horizontal pockets.

In 1908, he designed the more compact Hollerith 070 Vertical Sorting Machine that sorted 250 cards per minute.

The Type 71 Vertical Sorter came out in 1928. It had 12 pockets that could hold 80 cards. It could sort 150 cards per minute.

The Type 75, Model 1, 19??, 400 cards per minute

The Type 75, Model 2, 19??, 250 cards per minute

== IBM 80 series Sorters ==
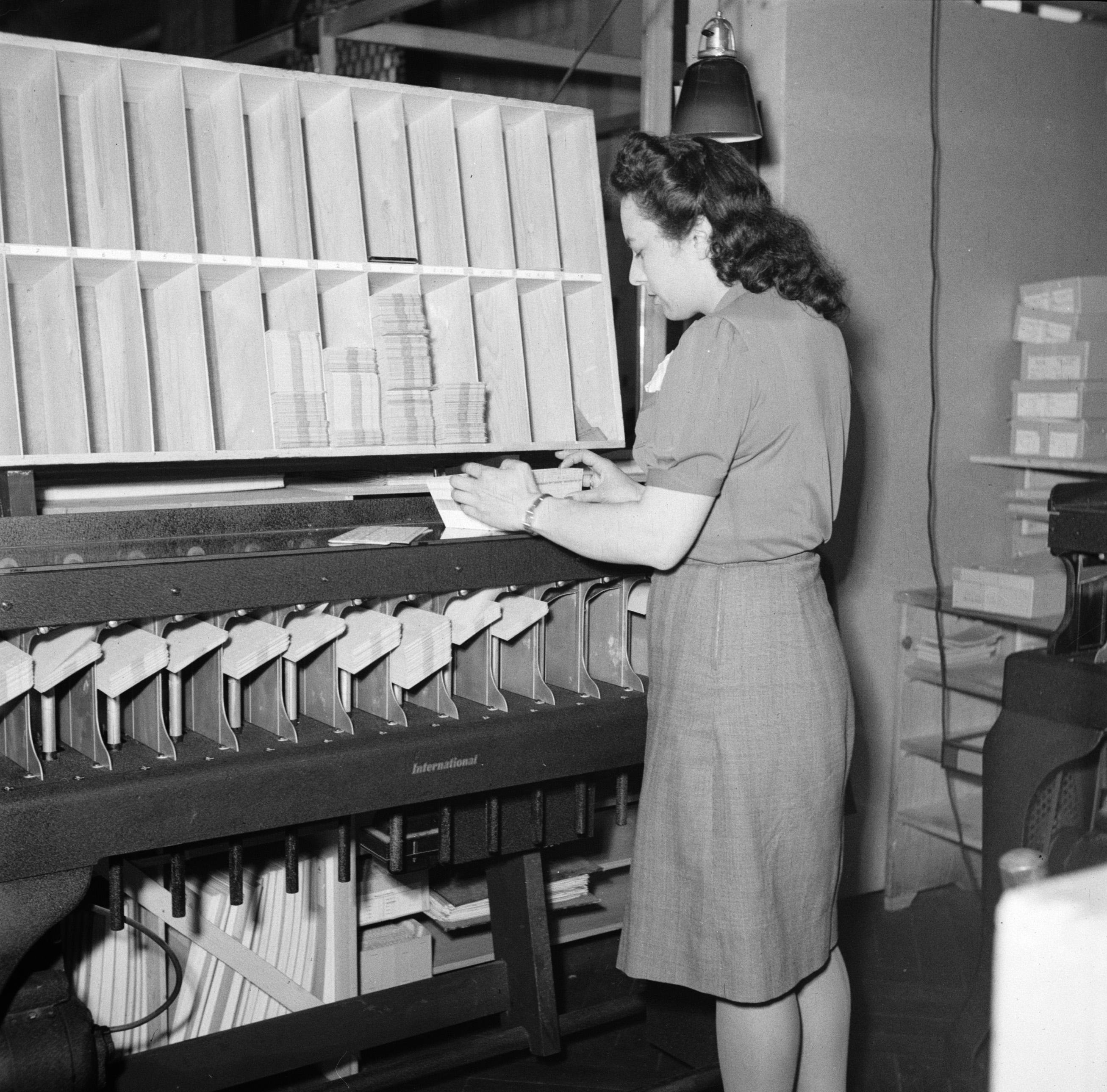
IBM card sorter at the Red Cross in Geneva, 1946; model 80, or possibly an 81

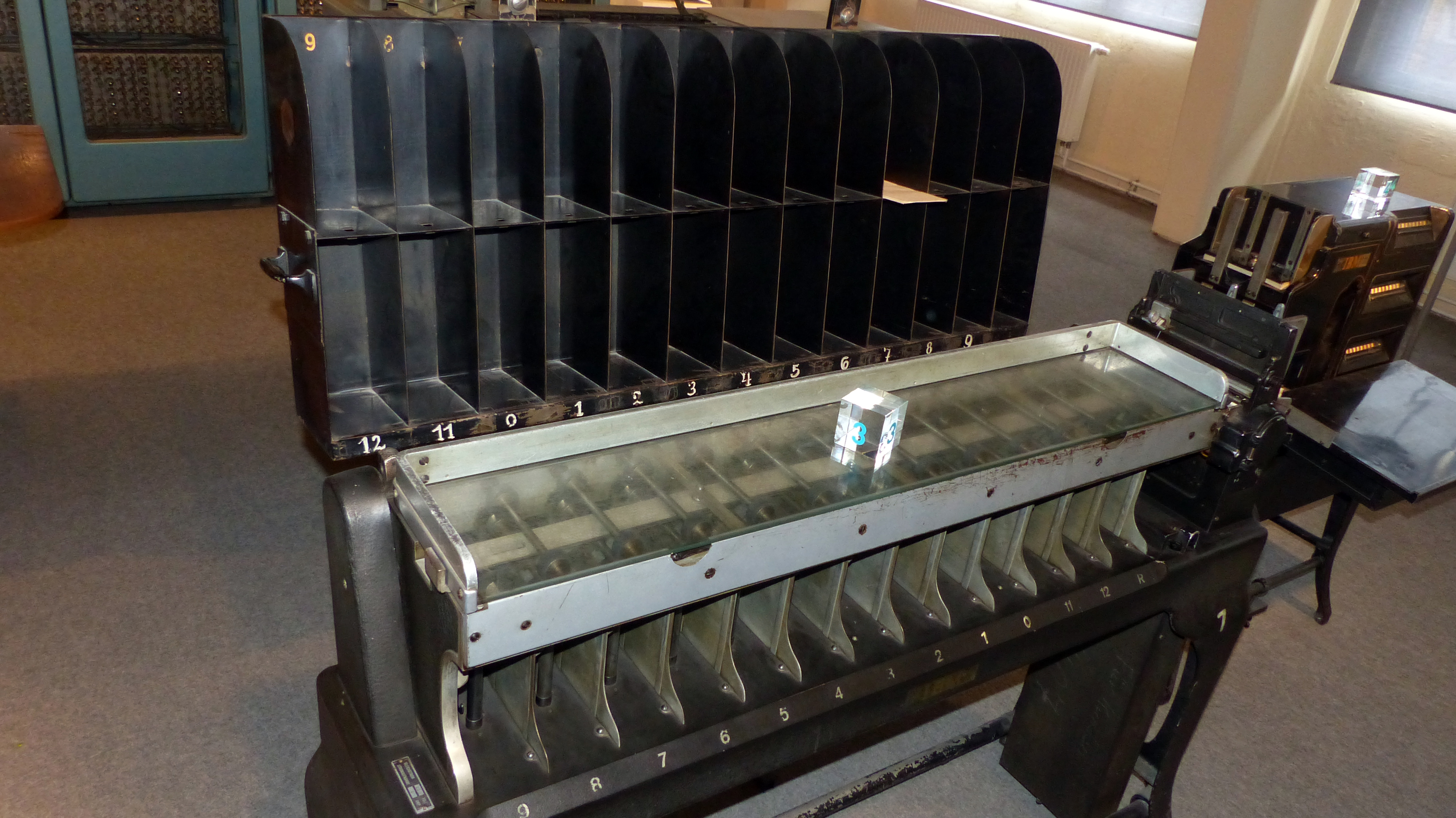
IBM 080

Card Sorters in the IBM 80 series included:

- IBM 80 Electric Punched Card Sorting Machine, model 1, Introduced by IBM in 1925, 450 cards per minute. This sorter was almost twice the speed of the older Hollerith 70 vertical sorter and used an entirely new magnetically operated horizontal design. At the close of 1943, IBM had 10,200 of these units on rental.
- IBM 80, model 2, 192?, 250 cards per minute
- IBM 81 Sorter, ????
- IBM 82 Sorter, 1949. Sorted cards at 650/minute
- IBM 83 Sorter, 1955. Sorted cards at 1000/minute
- IBM 84 Sorter, 1959. Sorted cards at 2000/minute

In August 1957, a basic 082 rented for $55 per month; an 083 for twice that. (IBM 1957) By 1969, only the 82, 83, and 84 were made available for rental by IBM.

== Modern card sorters ==
In the early 2020s, TCG Machines introduced a card sorting machine to process trading card game cards. The punched cards and brushes in these modern sorters have been replaced with image sensors (cameras) and computer vision technology, but their form and operation remain essentially identical to that of their historical predecessors.

== See also ==
- Bucket sort
- Unit record equipment
