= Kirkpatrick–Reisch sort =

Fast sort algorithm for items with limited-size integer keys

Kirkpatrick–Reisch sorting is a fast sorting algorithm for items with limited-size integer keys. It is notable for having an asymptotic time complexity that is better than radix sort.
