= TCG Machines =

Multinational robotics company

TCG Machines Inc.

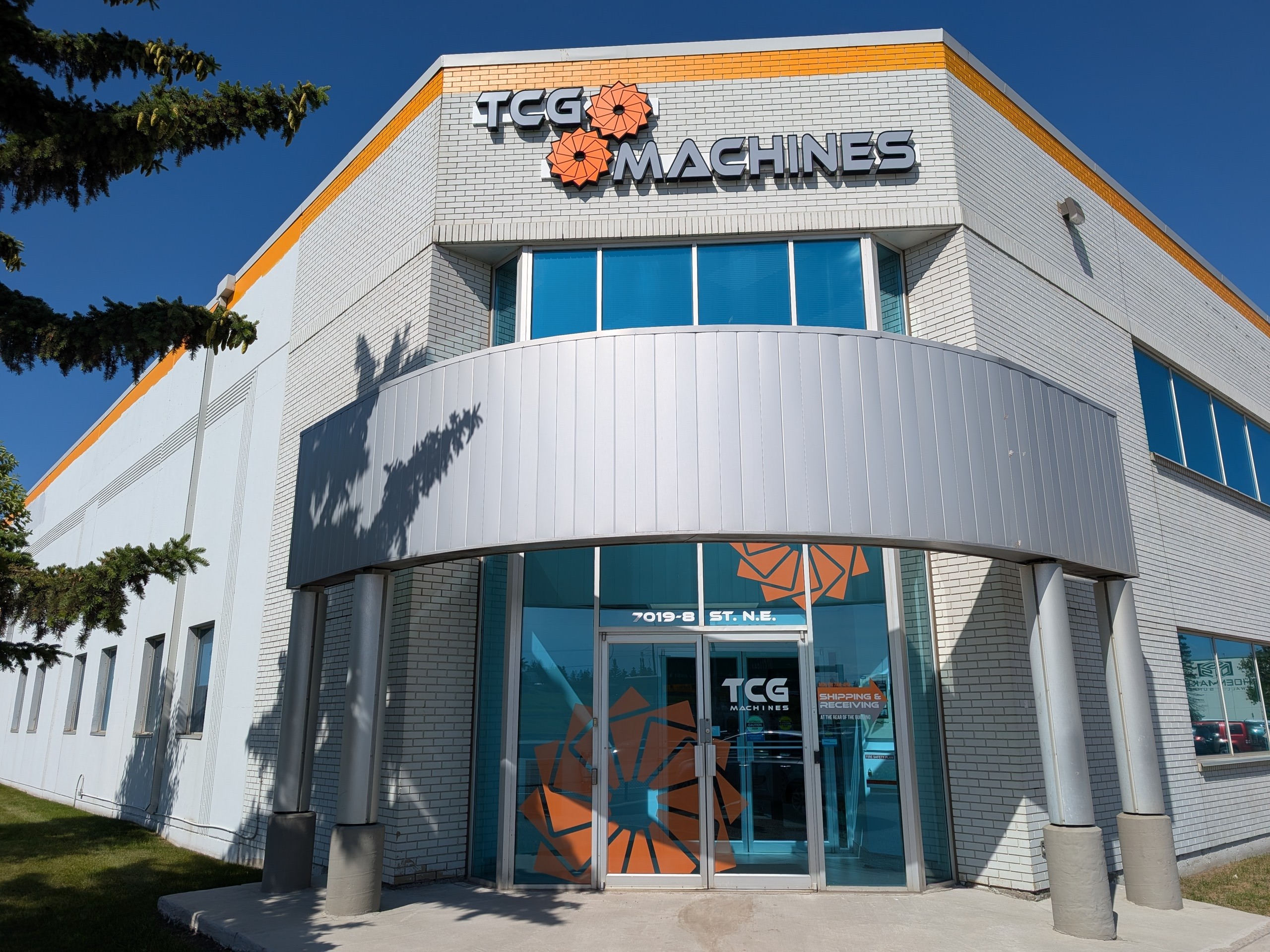
- Headquarters in Calgary, Canada
- Type: Privately held company
- Industry: Robotics; Automation; Artificial intelligence
- Founded: January 2, 2015; 11 years ago in Calgary, Alberta, Canada
- Founder: Graeme Gordon
- Headquarters: Calgary, Alberta, Canada
- Area served: Worldwide
- Key people: Graeme Gordon (CEO); Daniel Kusler (CPO)
- Products: PhyzBatch-9000
- Services: Digitization; Inventory Management; Quality assurance; Sorting; Valuation
- Number of employees: ▲40 (2026); 25 (2025); 15 (2024)
- Website: tcgmachines.com

TCG Machines Inc. is a Canadian multinational robotics company headquartered in Calgary, Alberta. TCG Machines designs and manufactures automated sorting machines for the trading card and trading card game (TCG) market. Their core product is the PhyzBatch-9000 (pronounced "fizz-batch", a portmanteau of "physical batch"), a machine capable of scanning, identifying, digitally cataloging, and physically separating Magic: The Gathering, Pokémon, Lorcana, and One Piece cards. The primary customer base for TCG Machines is game stores that buy and sell trading cards.

Incorporated on January 2, 2015, TCG Machines is led by CEO Graeme Gordon, P.Eng., and CPO Daniel Kusler, P.Eng. TCG Machines first made the PhyzBatch-9000 available for order in May 2021, with machines initially being available for lease in Canada and the United States. The first production model PhyzBatch-9000s were delivered to customers in June 2022. In 2024, the company made the PhyzBatch-9000 available in the United Kingdom and the European Union, with intentions for later expansion into Australia and Japan. As of August 2026, TCG Machines reported having 40 staff supporting 500 machines operating across 24 countries.

== History ==
=== Founding (2015–2016) ===
The company was incorporated federally on January 2, 2015 by Graeme Gordon. A player of the Magic: The Gathering card game, Gordon had completed a multi-day effort to sort through his personal card collection and realized there must be businesses which required card sorting services on a much larger scale. In the summer of 2016, Gordon made phone calls to 200 comic and game stores across eight Canadian provinces and 30 American states. Feedback from the phone survey was positive, with more than 90% of the stores contacted indicating they would be interested in acquiring an automated card sorter.

A mechanical engineer, Gordon was employed in Alberta's oil and gas industry as a designer of automated drilling equipment. In September 2016, Gordon left his oil and gas career and began working full-time to develop a trading card sorting robot.

=== PhyzBatch-9000 – Alpha Prototype (2016–2020) ===
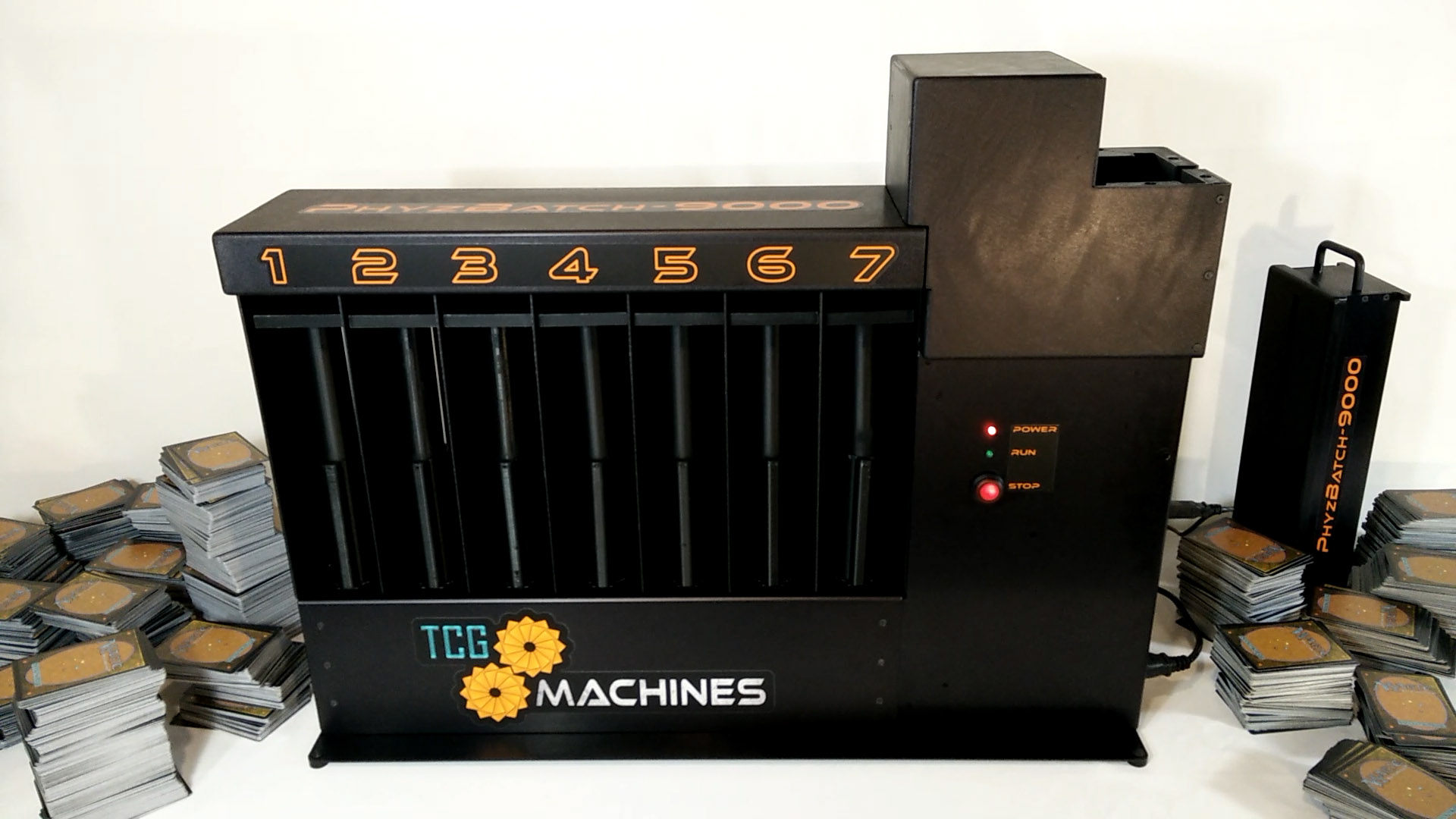
Alpha Prototype PhyzBatch-9000

In 2016, Gordon applied for a $10,000 grant through Alberta Innovates to hire his roommate, an electrical engineer, to design and prototype the circuit-boards required to control the robot. By 2018, Gordon had developed the first working machine, which he used to conduct product demonstrations for several game stores in Calgary. Following a demonstration, Phoenix Comics NW agreed to test trial the new machine. Between 2018 and 2020, Phoenix Comics processed one-million Magic: The Gathering cards using the alpha prototype PhyzBatch-9000.

=== PhyzBatch-9000 – Beta Prototypes (2020–2021) ===
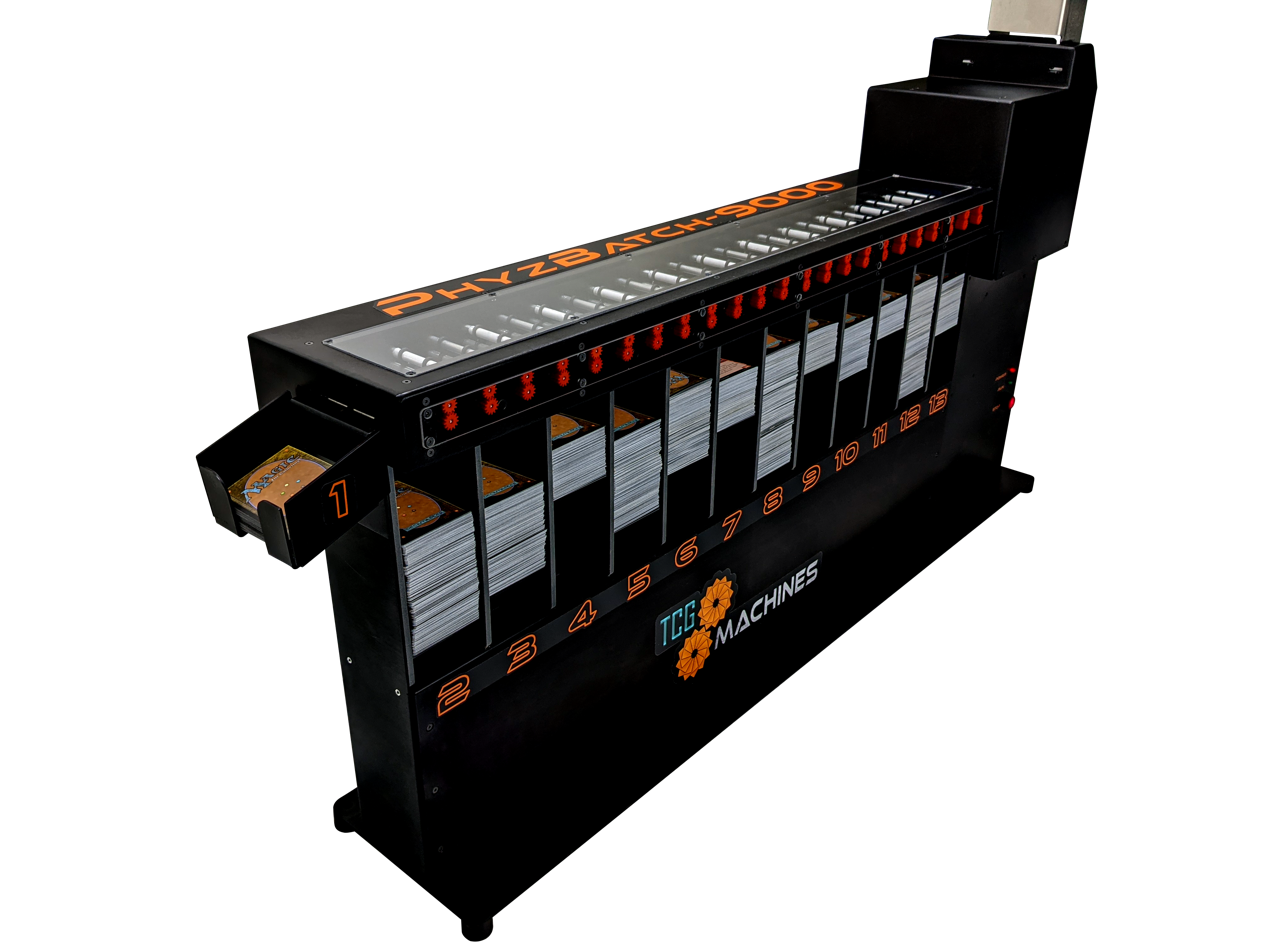
Beta Trial prototype version of the PhyzBatch-9000 trading card sorting machine.

In 2020, TCG Machines received a $100,000 grant from Alberta Innovates to build eight more prototype robots. These beta prototypes were distributed to customers across Alberta to further vet the technology prior to a commercial release of the PhyzBatch-9000.

=== PhyzBatch-9000 – Early Production (2021–2023) ===
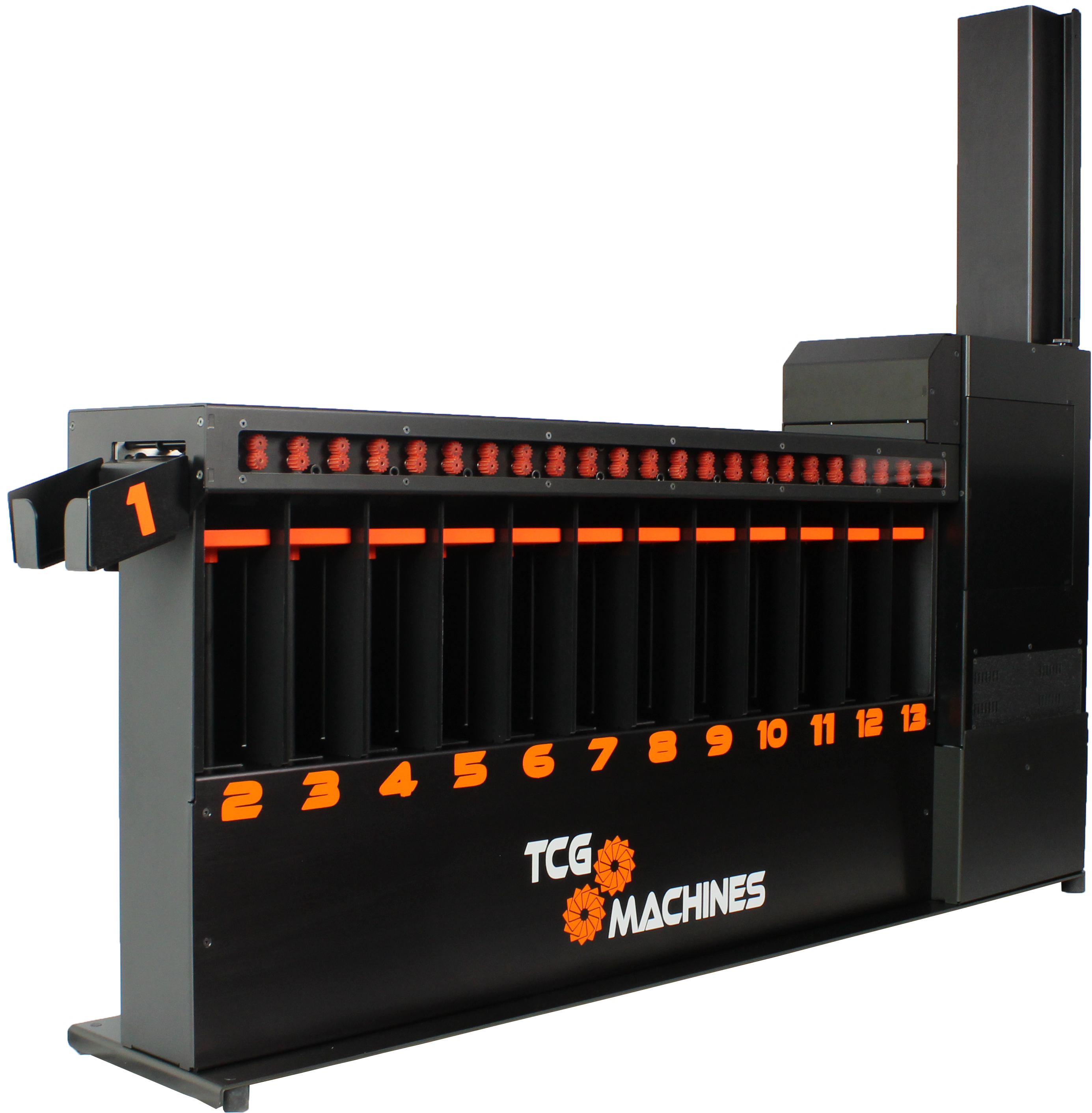
PhyzBatch-9000 Production Model Machine

On Star Wars Day, 2021, TCG Machines commercially launched the PhyzBatch-9000. The company received 50 orders over the first 30 days following the launch, and ended 2021 with five employees on staff.

The 2021–2023 global supply chain crisis brought on by the COVID-19 pandemic resulted in significant production delays, and the first production model PhyzBatch-9000s were not delivered until June 2022. In August 2022, TCG machines was awarded $75,000 in funding from the National Research Council Canada (NRC)'s Industrial Research Assistance Program (IRAP) to help improve their production processes. In December 2022, TCG Machines was awarded an additional $75,000 in funding through NRC-IRAP to expand their development team and improve upon their existing suite of software. The company ended 2022 with 20 employees on staff.

In February 2023, TCG Machines deployed their 100th machine. On July 2, 2023 TCG Machines' distributed fleet of PhyzBatch-9000s surpassed a collective total of 100-million trading cards processed. By August 1, 2023 the company had over 150 machines deployed.

=== Global expansion and Sports Cards (2023–present) ===
By 2023, TCG Machines had sent one PhyzBatch-9000 to Germany on a prototype basis, and in 2024 they began distribution in the UK. By the end of 2024, TCG Machines had PhyzBatch-9000s operating in seven countries with multi-million dollar annual revenues. The company has cited Australia and Japan as being other high priority markets for future expansion. TCG Machines has stated that they are developing software which will enable the PhyzBatch-9000 to process sports cards.

In 2025, the United States, which represents 95% of TCG Machines' customer base, imposed trade tariffs on products imported from Canada. In an interview, Gordon said the tariffs had not resulted in the loss of any customers. Over the course of 2025, the company doubled its staff, expanded exports to a total of 14 countries, and tripled their production capacity to keep up with demand. As of August 2026, TCG Machines reported having 40 staff supporting 500 machines operating across 24 countries, and their distributed fleet of robots had sorted more than one billion trading cards.

== Technology ==
=== Conveyance ===
The PhyzBatch-9000 is a double-roller based system, similar to that of punched card sorters, differentiating it from other commercial card sorting machines which are based on a Cartesian coordinate robot system. The PhyzBatch-9000 sorts and conveys cards at a rate of 60 cards per minute (3,600 cards per hour).

=== Recognition ===
To identify specific cards, the PhyzBatch-9000 uses cameras and optical sensors in combination with proprietary computer vision techniques. TCG Machines uses machine learning and artificial intelligence in their software.

TCG Machines has patents pending for rapid card quality assessment and holographic optical element (i.e. foil card) detection. The ability to differentiate between foil, or holofoil, cards and their regular counterparts allows the PhyzBatch-9000 to assign the appropriate value to cards based upon their foil, or non-foil, characteristic.

The PhyzBatch-9000 is not able to detect counterfeit cards.
