= Harold H. Seward =

American computer scientist

Harold Herbert Seward
- Born: July 24, 1930; Rutland, Vermont, United States
- Died: June 19, 2012 (aged 81); Arlington, Massachusetts, United States
- Education: Norwich University; Massachusetts Institute of Technology
- Known for: Radix sort and Counting sort; Whirlwind Computer
- Spouse: Janet Seward
- Scientific career
- Fields: Computer Science
- Workplaces: MIT Instrumentation Laboratory; MIT Lincoln Laboratory; HH Controls
- Doctoral advisor: Charles W. Adams

Harold H. Seward (July 24, 1930 – June 19, 2012) was a computer scientist, engineer, and inventor. Seward developed the radix sort and counting sort algorithms in 1954 at MIT. He also worked on the Whirlwind Computer and developed instruments that powered the guidance systems for the Apollo spacecraft and Polaris missile.
