= Roaming (disambiguation) =

Roaming is a wireless telecommunication term typically used with mobile devices.

Roaming or Roamin' may also refer to:

- Roaming user profile, a concept in the Windows NT family of operating systems
- Roaming (film), a 2013 Canadian film written and directed by Michael Ray Fox
- "Roaming", a song by Rod Wave from the album Pray 4 Love
- "Roamin'", a song by Fat Mattress from the album Fat Mattress II
- Roaming (musician), an alias of Irish musician Liam McCay/Sign Crushes Motorist

== See also ==
- Roam (disambiguation)
- Roamer (disambiguation)
- Rome (disambiguation)
