= Rahmer =

Rahmer is a surname. Notable people with the surname include:

- Moritz Rahmer (de) (1837–1904), German rabbi and publicist
- Sigismund Rahmer (de) (1866–1912), Jewish German doctor, writer and editor
- Hans Sigismund Rahmer (English: John Rayner; 1924–2005), German-English Liberal rabbi
- Will Rahmer (born 1969), American musician and vocalist

== See also ==
- Rohmer
