= Roam (disambiguation) =

"Roam" is the fourth single from The B-52's' 1989 hit album Cosmic Thing.

Roam may also refer to:

- ROAM (real-time optimally adapting mesh), a computer graphics algorithm
- ROAM (Réunion des Organismes d'Assurance Mutuelle) in France
- Roam (public transit), the bus operator in Banff, Alberta, Canada
- Roam (band), British pop punk band
- Roam (musician), a Canadian musician
- Roam Media, an online education brand purchased by Outside (company) in 2021
- Roam (software), a personal wiki/knowledge management system

== See also ==
- Free roam (disambiguation)
- Roamer (disambiguation)
- Roaming (disambiguation)
- Rome (disambiguation)
