= Romer =

Romer, Römer, Roemer, or similar may refer to:

- Romer (surname), includes a list of people with the name
- Romer (tool), a cartographic device also known as a reference card
- Rømer scale, a disused temperature scale named after Ole Rømer
- Römer, a medieval building in Frankfurt am Main
- Römer (crater), a lunar crater
- Romer arm, an industrial measuring device
- Romer v. Evans, a United States Supreme Court case dealing with civil rights and state laws
- Romer's gap in the record of vertebrate fossils c. 360–340 million years ago
- Romer Shoal Light, a lighthouse off the coast of New Jersey, United States
- Römer (glass), also rummer or roemer, a type of drinking glass popular in early modern Europe

== See also ==
- Roamer (disambiguation)
- Rohmer, surname
