= J. W. J. Williams =

English computer scientist (1930–2012)

John William Joseph (Bill) Williams (September 1930 – 29 September 2012) was a computer scientist best known for inventing heapsort and the binary heap data structure in 1963 while working for Elliot Bros. (London) Ltd.

== Personal life ==
He was born in England, in the district of Chippenham in Wiltshire County, to William Henry Williams and his wife (née Haines).

On 3 March 1962 he married age 31) married Ann Zerny (a nurse, age 23) at Christ Church in Chorleywood Parish in Hertfordshire County. They had three children.

In 1974, he moved to Ottawa, Ontario, Canada.

He died on 29 September 2012 at age 82.

== Career ==
In 1952, he received a B.Sc. in mathematics from King's College, University of London.

In England, he worked as a programmer for Elliot Automation, formerly Elliot Brothers (London) Limited, where he invented heapsort and used it to create the event-driven Elliott Simulator Package (ESP) with the help of C. A. R. (Tony) Hoare. He also worked for English Electric and GEC. He worked with Donald E. Knuth to develop a two-heap data structure that they called a "priority deque", published as an exercise in The Art of Computer Programming in 1973.

After moving to Canada in 1974, he worked for Bell-Northern Research Ltd., Ottawa (BNR) and Northern Telecom (Nortel) until retiring in 1995. At BNR, he worked on various software and hardware systems such as the DMS-100 digital telephone switch, publishing a paper about their software in June 1982.
