= Donald B. Johnson =

American computer scientist

- Born: Donald Bruce Johnson; December 16, 1933
- Died: September 10, 1994 (aged 60)
- Education: Cornell University
- Occupation: computer scientist
- Employer(s): Dartmouth College; Pennsylvania State University
- Known for: founding chair, Dartmouth College computer science department
- Notable work: d-ary heap data structure Johnson's algorithm

Donald Bruce Johnson (December 16, 1933 – September 10, 1994) was an American computer scientist, a researcher in the design and analysis of algorithms, and the founding chair of the computer science department at Dartmouth College.

Johnson received his Ph.D. from Cornell University in 1973 under the supervision of David Gries. He took a faculty position in the computer science department at Pennsylvania State University, and later moved to the department of mathematics at Dartmouth. When the Dartmouth computer science department was founded in 1994, he became its first chair.

Johnson invented the d-ary heap data structure, and is also known for Johnson's algorithm for the all-pairs shortest path problem.
