= Rohmer =

Rohmer is a surname. Notable people with the surname include:

- Ann Rohmer (born 1958), Canadian television personality
- Éric Rohmer (1920–2010), French film director
- Paul Rohmer (1876–1977), French physician
- Richard Rohmer (born 1924), Canadian military aviator and novelist
- Sax Rohmer (1883–1959), English novelist
- Stascha Rohmer (born 1966), German philosopher

== Fictional ==
- Betty Rohmer, fictional character in Dead Like Me

== See also ==
- Roamer (disambiguation)
- Romer (disambiguation)
