= Roamer =

Roamer may refer to:

- Roamer (watchmaker), a Swiss watch manufacturer
- Roamer (horse), an American racehorse
- Roamer, a car named after the race horse and built by the US based Barley Motor Car Co.
- USS Roamer, more than one United States Navy ship

== See also ==
- Romer (disambiguation)
- Roam (disambiguation)
- Rohmer, surname
