= ROAM =

Continuous level of detail algorithm

In 3D computer graphics and solid modeling, real-time optimally adapting mesh (ROAM) is a continuous level of detail algorithm that optimizes terrain meshes. On modern computers, sometimes it is more effective to send a small amount of unneeded polygons to the GPU, rather than burden the CPU with LOD (Level of Detail) calculations—making algorithms like geomipmapping more effective than ROAM. This technique is used by graphics programmers in order to produce high quality displays while being able to maintain real-time frame rates. Algorithms such as ROAM exist to provide a control over scene quality versus performance in order to provide HQ scenes while retaining real-time frame rates on hardware. ROAM largely aims toward terrain visualization, but various elements from ROAM are difficult to place within a game system.

To assist regional geological mapping, more abundant and visualized expression forms are highly needs. Thus, the 3D terrain model is adopted as the carrier for the demands in many correlative fields. Based on the regular grid DEM (Digital Elevation Model) in DRGS, ROAM algorithm is applied to create a more dynamic model, which will give consideration to the importance of different features and select correspondence level of detail.

The algorithm was introduced in a paper in the Proceedings of IEEE Visualization 1997 by M. Duchaineau and others.
