= Purely functional =

Purely functional may refer to:

== Computer science ==
- Pure function, a function that does not have side effects
- Purely functional data structure, a persistent data structure that does not rely on mutable state
- Purely functional programming, a programming paradigm that does not rely on mutable state

== Law ==
- Functionality doctrine, in intellectual property law

== See also ==
- Referential transparency
