= Addressable heap =

In computer science, an addressable heap is an abstract data type. Specifically, it is a mergeable heap supporting access to the elements of the heap via handles (also called references). It allows the key of the element referenced by a particular handle to be removed or decreased.

== Definition ==
An addressable heap supports the following operations:

- Make-Heap(), creating an empty heap.
- Insert(H,x), inserting an element x into the heap H, and returning a handle to it.
- Min(H), returning a handle to the minimum element, or Nil if no such element exists.
- Extract-Min(H), extracting and returning a handle to the minimum element, or Nil if no such element exists.
- Remove(h), removing the element referenced by h (from its respective heap).
- Decrease-Key(h,k), decreasing the key of the element referenced by h to k; illegal if k is larger than the key referenced by h.
- Merge(H1,H2), combining the elements of H1 and H2.

== Examples ==
Examples of addressable heaps include:

- Fibonacci heaps
- Binomial heaps

A more complete list with performance comparisons can be found here.
