= Randomized meldable heap =

In computer science, a randomized meldable heap (also Meldable Heap or Randomized Meldable Priority Queue) is a priority queue based data structure in which the underlying structure is also a heap-ordered binary tree. However, there are no restrictions on the shape of the underlying binary tree.

This approach has a number of advantages over similar data structures. It offers greater simplicity: all operations for the randomized meldable heap are easy to implement and the constant factors in their complexity bounds are small. There is also no need to preserve balance conditions and no satellite information within the nodes is necessary. Lastly, this structure has good worst-case time efficiency. The execution time of each individual operation is at most logarithmic with high probability.

== Operations ==
The randomized meldable heap supports a number of common operations. These are insertion, deletion, and a searching operation, findMin. The insertion and deletion operations are implemented in terms of an additional operation specific to the meldable heap, Meld(Q1, Q2).

=== Meld ===
The basic goal of the meld (also called merge) operation is to take two heaps (by taking each heap's root nodes), Q1 and Q2, and merges them, returning a single heap node as a result. This heap node is the root node of a heap containing all elements from the two subtrees rooted at Q1 and Q2.

A nice feature of this meld operation is that it can be defined recursively. If either heaps are null, then the merge is taking place with an empty set and the method simply returns the root node of the non-empty heap. If both Q1 and Q2 are not nil, check if Q1 > Q2. If it is, swap the two. It is therefore ensured that Q1 < Q2 and that the root node of the merged heap will contain Q1. We then recursively merge Q2 with Q1.left or Q1.right. This step is where the randomization comes in as this decision of which side to merge with is determined by a coin toss.

function Meld(Node Q1, Node Q2)
    if Q1 is nil => return Q2
    if Q2 is nil => return Q1
    if Q1 > Q2 => swap Q1 and Q2
    if coin_toss is 0 => Q1.left = Meld(Q1.left, Q2)
    else Q1.right = Meld(Q1.right, Q2)
    return Q1

=== Insert ===
With the meld operation complete, inserting into the meldable heap is easy. First, a new node, u, is created containing the value x. This new node is then simply melded with the heaps root node.

function Insert(x)
    Node u = new Node
    u.x = x
    root = Meld(u, root)
    root.parent = nil
    increment node count

=== Remove ===
Similarly easy to the insert operation, Remove() uses the Meld operation to eliminate the root node from the heap. This is done by simply melding the two children of the root node and making the returned node the new root.

function Remove()
    root = Meld(root.left, root.right)
    if root is not nil => root.parent = nil
    decrement node count

=== FindMin ===
Possibly the easiest operation for the randomized meldable heap, FindMin() simply returns the element currently stored in the heap's root node.

=== Additional operations ===
Some additional operations that can be implemented for the meldable heap that also have O(log n) worst-case efficiency are:

- Remove(u) - Remove the node u and its key from the heap.
- Absorb(Q) - Add all elements of the meldable heap Q to this heap, emptying Q in the process.
- DecreaseKey(u, y) - Decreases the key in node u to y (pre-condition: y ≤ u.x).

== Efficiency analysis ==
As all non-constant-time operations are defined in terms of the Meld operation, the efficiency of these operations can be determined through analysis of the complexity of melding two randomized heaps.

The result of this analysis is that the expected time of any meldable priority queue operation on a n-node randomized heap is O(log n). This expected time complexity is derived from the properties of random walks on binary trees. According to Lemma 10.1 of Pat Morin's textbook, a random walk starting at the root of any binary tree with n nodes, where each step proceeds to either the left or right child with equal probability, has an expected length of at most log2(n + 1), regardless of the tree's shape. Since each step of the recursive meld operation corresponds to a step in a random walk down the left or right paths of the heaps being merged, the expected number of comparisons is bounded by the sum of the expected random walk lengths on both heaps.

| Operation | Worst-Case Time Efficiency |
|---|---|
| Meld(Q1, Q2) | O(log n) |
| Insert(x) | O(log n) |
| Remove() | O(log n) |
| FindMin() | O(1) |
| Remove(x) | O(log n) |
| Absorb(Q) | O(log n) |

== History ==
The meldable heap appears to have first been proposed in 1998 by Gambin and Malinowski.

== Variants ==
While the randomized meldable heap is the simplest form of a meldable heap implementation, others do exist. These are:

- Leftist heap
- Binomial heap
- Fibonacci heap
- Pairing heap
- Skew heap
