= Phil Bagwell =

Computer scientist

Phil Bagwell (died 6 October 2012) was a computer scientist known for his work and influence in the area of persistent data structures. He is best known for his 2000 invention of hash array mapped tries.

Bagwell was probably the most influential researcher in the field of persistent data structures from 2000 until his death. His work is now a standard part of the runtimes of functional programming languages including Clojure, Scala, and Haskell.

His contributions to building the Scala community are remembered in the Phil Bagwell Memorial Scala Community Award.

== Publications ==
- "Ideal Hash Trees" (2000), EPFL Technical Report
- "Fast Functional Lists, Hash-Lists, Deques and Variable Length Arrays" (2002), EPFL Technical Report
- "RRB Vector: A Practical General Purpose Immutable Sequence" (published posthumously in 2015) with Nicolas Stucki, Tiark Rompf, and Vlad Ureche, ICFP 2015
  - "RRB-Trees: Efficient Immutable Vectors" (2012) with Tiark Rompf, EPFL Technical Report
