= Mergeable heap =

In computer science, a mergeable heap (also called a meldable heap) is an abstract data type, which is a heap supporting a merge operation.

== Definition ==
A mergeable heap supports the usual heap operations:

- Make-Heap(), create an empty heap.
- Insert(H,x), insert an element x into the heap H.
- Min(H), return the minimum element, or Nil if no such element exists.
- Extract-Min(H), extract and return the minimum element, or Nil if no such element exists.

And one more that distinguishes it:

- Merge(H1,H2), combine the elements of H1 and H2 into a single heap.

== Trivial implementation ==
It is straightforward to implement a mergeable heap given a simple heap:

Merge(H1,H2):

1. x ← Extract-Min(H2)
2. while x ≠ Nil
  1. Insert(H1, x)
  2. x ← Extract-Min(H2)

This can however be wasteful as each Extract-Min(H) and Insert(H,x) typically have to maintain the heap property.

== More efficient implementations ==
Examples of mergeable heap data structures include:

- Binomial heap
- Fibonacci heap
- Leftist tree
- Pairing heap
- Skew heap

A more complete list with performance comparisons can be found at Heap (data structure) § Comparison of theoretic bounds for variants.

In most mergeable heap structures, merging is the fundamental operation on which others are based. Insertion is implemented by merging a new single-element heap with the existing heap. Deletion is implemented by merging the children of the deleted node.

== See also ==
- Addressable heap
