= Purely functional programming =

Programming paradigm entirely based on functions

In computer science, purely functional programming usually designates a programming paradigm—a style of building the structure and elements of computer programs—that treats all computation as the evaluation of mathematical functions.

Program state and mutable objects are usually modeled with temporal logic, as explicit variables that represent the program state at each step of a program execution: a variable state is passed as an input parameter of a state-transforming function, which returns the updated state as part of its return value. This style handles state changes without losing the referential transparency of the program expressions.

Purely functional programming consists of ensuring that functions, inside the functional paradigm, will only depend on their arguments, regardless of any global or local state. A pure functional subroutine only has visibility of changes of state represented by state variables included in its scope.

== Difference between pure and impure functional programming ==
The exact difference between pure and impure functional programming is a matter of controversy. Sabry's proposed definition of purity is that all common evaluation strategies (call-by-name, call-by-value, and call-by-need) produce the same result, ignoring strategies that error or diverge.

A program is usually said to be functional when it uses some concepts of functional programming, such as first-class functions and higher-order functions. However, a first-class function need not be purely functional, as it may use techniques from the imperative paradigm, such as arrays or input/output methods that use mutable cells, which update their state as side effects. In fact, the earliest programming languages cited as being functional, IPL and Lisp, are both "impure" functional languages by Sabry's definition.

== Properties of purely functional programming ==
=== Strict versus non-strict evaluation ===
Each evaluation strategy which ends on a purely functional program returns the same result. In particular, it ensures that the programmer does not have to consider in which order programs are evaluated, since eager evaluation will return the same result as lazy evaluation. However, it is still possible that an eager evaluation may not terminate while the lazy evaluation of the same program halts. An advantage of this is that lazy evaluation can be implemented much more easily; as all expressions will return the same result at any moment (regardless of program state), their evaluation can be delayed as much as necessary.

=== Parallel computing ===
In a purely functional language, the only dependencies between computations are data dependencies, and computations are deterministic. Therefore, to program in parallel, the programmer need only specify the pieces that should be computed in parallel, and the runtime can handle all other details such as distributing tasks to processors, managing synchronization and communication, and collecting garbage in parallel. This style of programming avoids common issues such as race conditions and deadlocks, but has less control than an imperative language.

To ensure a speedup, the granularity of tasks must be carefully chosen to be neither too big nor too small. In theory, it is possible to use runtime profiling and compile-time analysis to judge whether introducing parallelism will speed up the program, and thus automatically parallelize purely functional programs. In practice, this has not been terribly successful, and fully automatic parallelization is not practical.

=== Data structures ===
Purely functional data structures are persistent. Persistency is required for functional programming; without it, the same computation could return different results. Functional programming may use persistent non-purely functional data structures, while those data structures may not be used in purely functional programs.

Purely functional data structures are often represented in a different way than their imperative counterparts. For example, array with constant-time access and update is a basic component of most imperative languages and many imperative data-structures, such as hash table and binary heap, are based on arrays. Arrays can be replaced by map or random access list, which admits purely functional implementation, but the access and update time is logarithmic. Therefore, purely functional data structures can be used in languages which are non-functional, but they may not be the most efficient tool available, especially if persistency is not required.

In general, conversion of an imperative program to a purely functional one also requires ensuring that the formerly-mutable structures are now explicitly returned from functions that update them, a program structure called store-passing style.

== Purely functional language ==
A purely functional language is a language which only admits purely functional programming. Purely functional programs can however be written in languages which are not purely functional.
