= Chris Okasaki =

American academic

Chris Okasaki is an associate professor of computer science at the United States Military Academy. He authored Purely Functional Data Structures (1998), based on a doctoral dissertation of the same name. He obtained a Ph.D. at Carnegie Mellon University in 1996 under advisers Peter Lee, Robert Harper, Daniel Sleator, and Robert Tarjan. Prior to his current academic appointment, he taught at Columbia University and the University of Glasgow.

== Purely functional data structures ==
Okasaki published his doctoral dissertation as a book in 1998. It approaches the topic of data structures from a functional programming perspective, describing techniques for designing immutable structures that incorporate persistence.
