= Relaxed k-d tree =

Multidimensional search tree for spatial coordinates

- Type: Multidimensional BST
- Invented: 1998
- Invented by: Amalia Duch, Vladimir Estivill-Castro and Conrado Martínez
Time complexity in big O notation
Operation	Average	Worst case
Search	O(log n)	O(n)
Insert	O(log n)	O(n)
Delete	O(log n)	O(n)
Space complexity
Space	O(n)	O(n)

A relaxed K-d tree or relaxed K-dimensional tree is a data structure which is a variant of K-d trees. Like K-dimensional trees, a relaxed K-dimensional tree stores a set of n-multidimensional records, each one having a unique K-dimensional key x=(x_{0},... ,x_{K−1}). Unlike K-d trees, in a relaxed K-d tree, the discriminants in each node are arbitrary. Relaxed K-d trees were introduced in 1998.

== Definitions ==
A relaxed K-d tree for a set of K-dimensional keys is a binary tree in which:

1. Each node contains a K-dimensional record and has associated an arbitrary discriminant j ∈ {0,1,...,K − 1}.
2. For every node with key x and discriminant j, the following invariant is true: any record in the left subtree with key y satisfies y_{j} < x_{j}, and any record in the right subtree with key y satisfies y_{j} ≥ x_{j}.

If K = 1, a relaxed K-d tree is a binary search tree.

As in a K-d tree, a relaxed K-d tree of size n induces a partition of the domain D into n+1 regions, each corresponding to a leaf in the K-d tree. The bounding box (or bounds array) of a node {x,j} is the region of the space delimited by the leaf in which x falls when it is inserted into the tree. Thus, the bounding box of the root {y,i} is [0,1]^{K}, the bounding box of the left subtree's root is [0,1] × ... × [0,y_{i}] × ... × [0,1], and so on.

== Supported queries ==
The average time complexities in a relaxed K-d tree with n records are:

- Exact match queries: O(log n)
- Partial match queries: O(n^{1−f(s/K)}), where:
  - s out of K attributes are specified
  - with 0 < f(s/K) < 1, a real valued function of s/K
- Nearest neighbor queries: O(log n)

== See also ==
- k-d tree
- implicit k-d tree, a k-d tree defined by an implicit splitting function rather than an explicitly-stored set of splits
- min/max k-d tree, a k-d tree that associates a minimum and maximum value with each of its nodes
