= BKD =

BKD may refer to

- Bacterial kidney disease, a systemic infection in wild salmonoid fish
- Bankard, one of the largest credit card issuers in the Philippines (stock symbol BKD)
- Bharatiya Kranti Dal, an Indian political party active from 1967 to 1977
- BKD, LLP, one of the largest U.S. accounting and advisory firms
- BKD tree, a tree data structure for subdividing a k-dimensional search space in computer science
- Blakedown railway station, Worcestershire, England (station code BKD)
- Brookdale Senior Living, an American operator of retirement communities (stock symbol BKD)
- Bukid language, an Austronesian language of the Philippines (ISO 639-3 code BKD)
- Stephens County Airport in Breckenridge, Texas (IATA code BKD)
