= (1+ε)-approximate nearest neighbor search =

Variant of the nearest neighbor search problem

(1+ε)-approximate nearest neighbor search is a variant of the nearest neighbor search problem. A solution to the (1+ε)-approximate nearest neighbor search is a point or multiple points within distance (1+ε) R from a query point, where R is the distance between the query point and its true nearest neighbor.

Reasons to approximate nearest neighbor search include the space and time costs of exact solutions in high-dimensional spaces (see curse of dimensionality) and that in some domains, finding an approximate nearest neighbor is an acceptable solution.

Approaches for solving (1+ε)-approximate nearest neighbor search include k-d trees, locality-sensitive hashing and brute-force search.
