= Line of sight (video games) =

What can be seen by a game participant

Line of sight, sometimes written line-of-sight or abbreviated to LoS, is the visibility (that is, who can see what) on the playing field in wargames and some role-playing games (RPGs). Many abilities can only be used on entities within a character's line of sight.

In some games, miniature figures are used to determine line of sight. Many wargames use counters to represent units and determine line of sight. A common technique is to hold a length of thread between two counters. If the thread, held straight, doesn't encounter any obstacles, the line of sight is valid.

The first computer game to implement line of sight graphics was Dungeon, which was played on a PDP-10 mainframe computer (1975).

== Examples ==
A tank behind a tall hill would not be able to see an enemy tank on the other side of the hill. Therefore, the first tank does not have a line of sight to the enemy tank. Conversely, a squad of soldiers atop the hill may be able to see both tanks, though the tanks may not be able to see them (since the tank's upward line of sight is limited).

In an RPG, players may not see doors, objects or monsters located around the corner in a dungeon.

Line of sight is crucial to many types of video games, including, but not limited to, first-person shooters, strategy games, stealth games, and role-playing video games. In simplistic games with a top-down perspective, such as roguelikes, Bresenham's line algorithm can be used to determine line of sight. In first person games such as battlefield and flight simulators an implicit min/max kd-tree may be used to efficiently evaluate terrain line of sight queries.

In some live action role-playing games, such as NERO International, the line of sight is used as the duration for some spells and abilities. For example, a paralyze spell only lasts as long as the target remains within line of sight of the spell's caster.

On the other hand, line of sight can be used offensively, like luring a player behind a pillar in order to set a trap - his teammate, being out of line of sight, won't be able to help out until he gets in LoS, which in turn takes time. This time is usually the key moment to strike and go for a kill, if said player falls in said trap.

One algorithm for calculating 2-dimensional line of sight is given in the StraightEdge project.
