= Cover tree =

Type of data structure

The cover tree is a type of data structure in computer science that is specifically designed to facilitate the speed-up of a nearest neighbor search. It is a refinement of the Navigating Net data structure, and related to a variety of other data structures developed for indexing intrinsically low-dimensional data.

The tree can be thought of as a hierarchy of levels with the top level containing the root point and the bottom level containing every point in the metric space. Each level C is associated with an integer value i that decrements by one as the tree is descended. Each level C in the cover tree has three important properties:

- Nesting: $C_{i} \subseteq C_{i-1}$
- Covering: For every point $p \in C_{i-1}$, there exists a point $q \in C_{i}$ such that the distance from $p$ to $q$ is less than or equal to $2^{i}$ and exactly one such $q$ is a parent of $p$.
- Separation: For all points $p,q \in C_i$, the distance from $p$ to $q$ is greater than $2^{i}$.

== Complexity ==
=== Find ===
Like other metric trees the cover tree allows for nearest neighbor searches in $O(\eta*\log{n})$ where $\eta$ is a constant associated with the dimensionality of the dataset and n is the cardinality. To compare, a basic linear search requires $O(n)$, which is a much worse dependence on $n$. However, in high-dimensional metric spaces the $\eta$ constant is non-trivial, which means it cannot be ignored in complexity analysis. Unlike other metric trees, the cover tree has a theoretical bound on its constant that is based on the dataset's expansion constant or doubling constant (in the case of approximate NN retrieval). The bound on search time is $O(c^{12} \log{n})$ where $c$ is the expansion constant of the dataset.

=== Insert ===
Although cover trees provide faster searches than the naive approach, this advantage must be weighed with the additional cost of maintaining the data structure. In a naive approach adding a new point to the dataset is trivial because order does not need to be preserved, but in a cover tree it can take $O(c^6 \log{n})$ time. However, this is an upper-bound, and some techniques have been implemented that seem to improve the performance in practice.

=== Space ===
The cover tree uses implicit representation to keep track of repeated points. Thus, it only requires O(n) space.

== See also ==
- Nearest neighbor search
- kd-tree
- M-tree
