= Pagoda (data structure) =

In computer science, a pagoda is a priority queue implemented with a variant of a binary tree. The root points to its children, as in a binary tree. Every other node points back to its parent and down to its leftmost (if it is a right child) or rightmost (if it is a left child) descendant leaf. The basic operation is merge or meld, which maintains the heap property. An element is inserted by merging it as a singleton. The root is removed by merging its right and left children. Merging is bottom-up, merging the leftmost edge of one with the rightmost edge of the other.
