= Expansive homeomorphism =

In mathematics, the notion of expansivity formalizes the notion of points moving away from one another under the action of an iterated function. The idea of expansivity is fairly rigid, as the definition of positive expansivity, below, as well as the Schwarz–Ahlfors–Pick theorem demonstrate.

== Definition ==
If $(X,d)$ is a metric space, a homeomorphism $f\colon X\to X$ is said to be expansive if there is a constant

$$\varepsilon_0>0,$$

called the expansivity constant, such that for every pair of points $x\neq y$ in $X$ there is an integer $n$ such that

$$d(f^n(x),f^n(y))\geq\varepsilon_0.$$

Note that in this definition, $n$ can be positive or negative, and so $f$ may be expansive in the forward or backward directions.

The space $X$ is often assumed to be compact, since under that assumption expansivity is a topological property; i.e. if $d'$ is any other metric generating the same topology as $d$, and if $f$ is expansive in $(X,d)$, then $f$ is expansive in $(X,d')$ (possibly with a different expansivity constant).

If

$$f\colon X\to X$$

is a continuous map, we say that $X$ is positively expansive (or forward expansive) if there is a

$$\varepsilon_0$$

such that, for any $x\neq y$ in $X$, there is an $n\in\mathbb{N}$ such that $d(f^n(x),f^n(y))\geq \varepsilon_0$.

== Theorem of uniform expansivity ==
Given f an expansive homeomorphism of a compact metric space, the theorem of uniform expansivity states that for every $\epsilon>0$ and $\delta>0$ there is an $N>0$ such that for each pair $x,y$ of points of $X$ such that $d(x,y)>\epsilon$, there is an $n\in \mathbb{Z}$ with $\vert n\vert\leq N$ such that

$$d(f^n(x),f^n(y)) > c-\delta,$$

where $c$ is the expansivity constant of $f$ (proof).

== Discussion ==
Positive expansivity is much stronger than expansivity. In fact, one can prove that if $X$ is compact and $f$ is a positively expansive homeomorphism, then $X$ is finite (proof).
