= Tree structure =

Way of representing the hierarchical nature of a structure in a graphical form

A tree structure showing the possible hierarchical organization of an encyclopedia

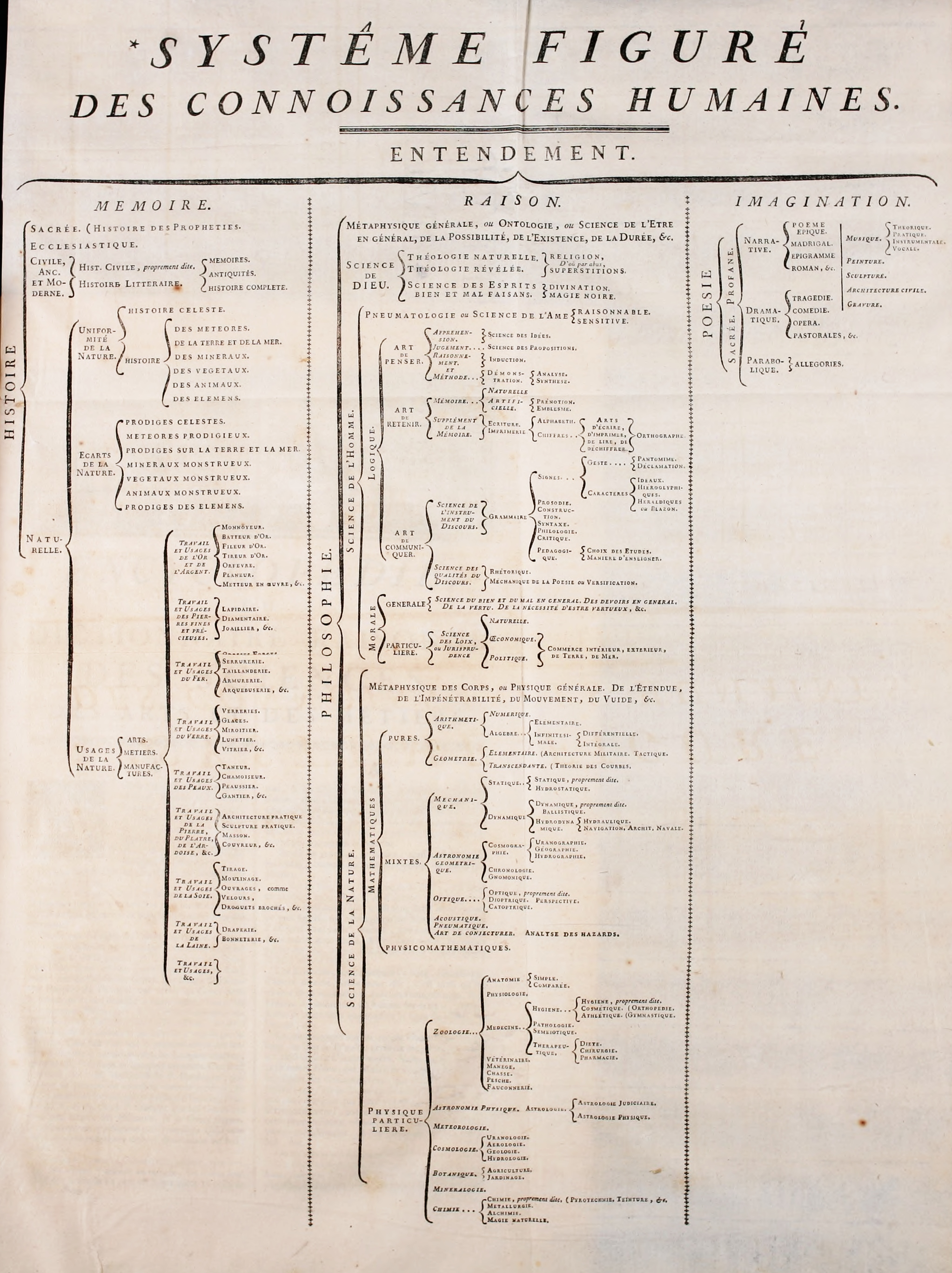
The original Encyclopédie (1752) used a tree diagram to show the way in which its subjects were ordered.

A tree structure, tree diagram, or tree model is a way of representing the hierarchical nature of a structure in a graphical form. It is named a "tree structure" because the classic representation resembles a tree, although the chart is generally upside down compared to a biological tree, with the "stem" at the top and the "leaves" at the bottom.

A tree structure is conceptual, and appears in several forms. For a discussion of tree structures in specific fields, see Tree (data structure) for computer science; insofar as it relates to graph theory, see tree (graph theory) or tree (set theory). Other related articles are listed below.

== Terminology and properties ==
The tree elements are called "nodes". The lines connecting elements are called "branches". Nodes without children are called leaf nodes, "end-nodes", or "leaves".

Every finite tree structure has a member that has no superior. This member is called the "root" or root node. The root is the starting node. But the converse is not true: infinite tree structures may or may not have a root node.

The names of relationships between nodes model the kinship terminology of family relations. The gender-neutral names "parent" and "child" have largely displaced the older "father" and "son" terminology. The term "uncle" is still widely used for other nodes at the same level as the parent.

- A node's "parent" is a node one step higher in the hierarchy (i.e. closer to the root node) and lying on the same branch.
- "Sibling" ("brother" or "sister") nodes share the same parent node.
- A node's "uncles" are siblings of that node's parent.
- A node that is connected to all lower-level nodes is called an "ancestor". The connected lower-level nodes are "descendants" of the ancestor node.

In the example, "encyclopedia" is the parent of "science" and "culture", its children. "Art" and "craft" are siblings, and children of "culture", which is their parent and thus one of their ancestors. Also, "encyclopedia", as the root of the tree, is the ancestor of "science", "culture", "art" and "craft". Finally, "science", "art" and "craft", as leaves, are ancestors of no other node.

Tree structures can depict all kinds of taxonomic knowledge, such as family trees, the biological evolutionary tree, the evolutionary tree of a language family, the grammatical structure of a language (a key example being S → NP VP, meaning a sentence is a noun phrase and a verb phrase, with each in turn having other components which have other components), the way web pages are logically ordered in a web site, mathematical trees of integer sets, et cetera.

The Oxford English Dictionary records use of both the terms "tree structure" and "tree-diagram" from 1965 in Noam Chomsky's Aspects of the Theory of Syntax.

In a tree structure there is one and only one path from any point to any other point.

Computer science uses tree structures extensively (see Tree (data structure) and telecommunications.)

For a formal definition see set theory, and for a generalization in which children are not necessarily successors, see prefix order.

== Examples of tree structures ==
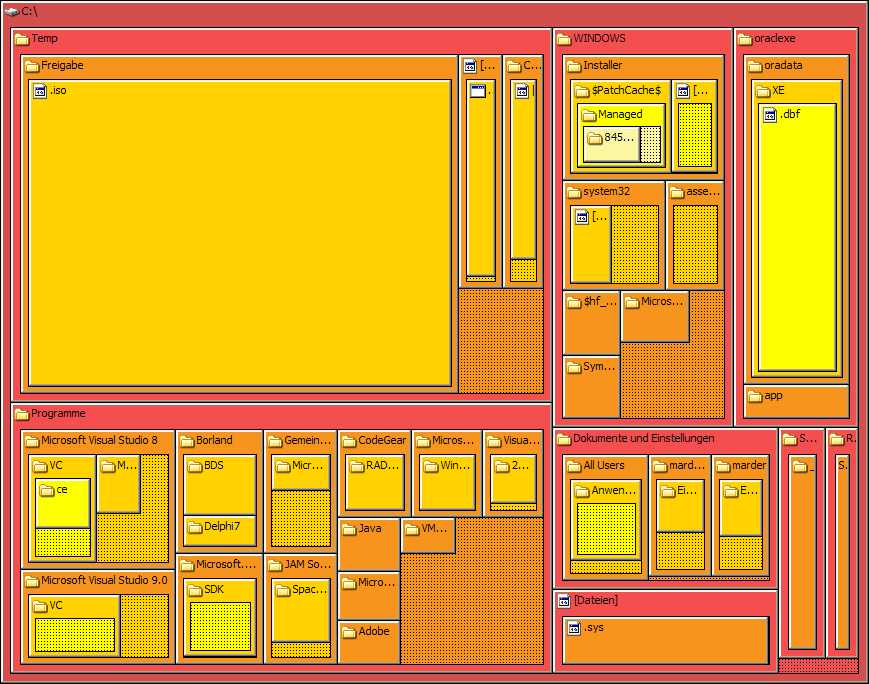
A tree map used to represent a directory structure as a nested set

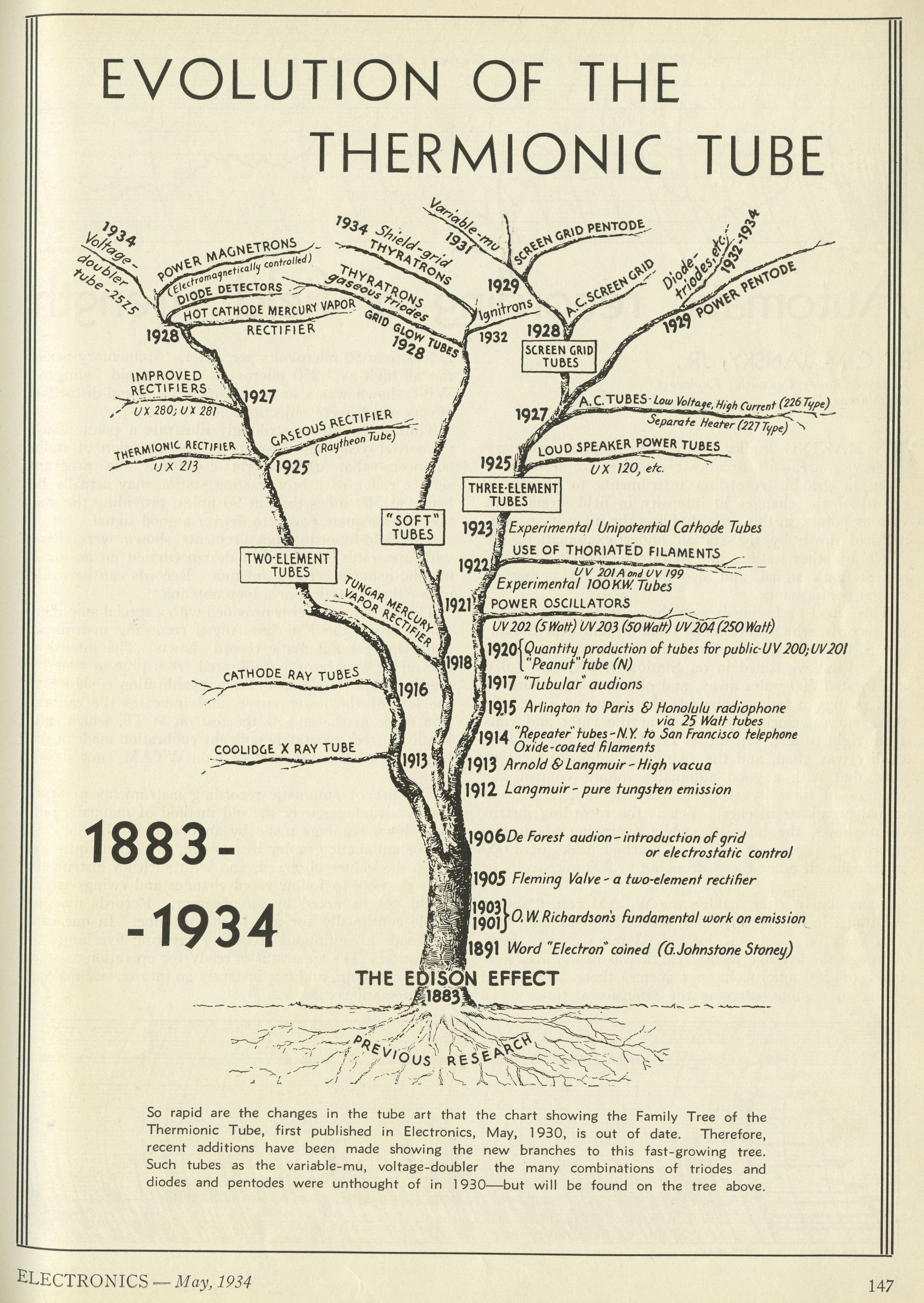
A diagram in the shape of a tree illustrating the "evolution" of thermionic tubes (a type of vacuum tube) between 1883 and 1934

- Internet:
  - usenet hierarchy
  - Document Object Model's logical structure, Yahoo! subject index, Curlie
- Operating system: directory structure
- Information management: Dewey Decimal System, PSH, this hierarchical bulleted list
- Management: hierarchical organizational structures
- Computer science:
  - binary search tree
  - red–black tree
  - AVL tree
  - R-tree
  - doubly logarithmic tree
- Biology: evolutionary tree
- Business: pyramid selling scheme
- Project management: work breakdown structure
- Linguistics:
  - (Syntax) Phrase structure trees
  - (Historical Linguistics) Tree model of language change
- Sports: business chess, playoffs brackets
- Mathematics: Von Neumann universe
- Group theory: descendant trees

== Representing trees ==
There are many ways of visually representing tree structures. Almost always, these boil down to variations, or combinations, of a few basic styles:

=== Classical node-link diagrams ===
Classical node-link diagrams, that connect nodes together with line segments:

encyclopedia
/ culture		\ science
/ art	\ craft

=== Nested sets ===
Nested sets that use enclosure or containment to show parenthood; examples include TreeMaps, fractal maps, and Euler diagrams:

encyclopedia

culture; art craft	science

=== Layered "icicle" diagrams ===
Layered "icicle" diagrams that use alignment/adjacency.

encyclopedia
culture		science
art	craft

=== Outlines and tree views ===
Lists or diagrams that use indentation, sometimes called "outlines" or "tree views".

An outline:

encyclopedia

culture

art
craft

science

A tree view:

- encyclopedia
  - culture
    - art
    - craft
  - science

=== Nested parentheses ===
A correspondence to nested parentheses was first noticed by Sir Arthur Cayley:

((art,craft)culture,science)encyclopedia
or
encyclopedia(culture(art,craft),science)

=== Radial trees ===
Trees can also be represented radially:

art \	craft /
culture |
encyclopedia
| science

== See also ==
Kinds of trees

- B-tree
- Dancing tree
- Decision tree
- Left-child right-sibling binary tree
- Porphyrian tree
- Tree (data structure)
- Tree (graph theory)
- Tree (set theory)

Related articles

- Data drilling
- Hierarchical model: clustering and query
- Tree testing
