= Doubly logarithmic tree =

Concept in computer science

In computer science, a doubly logarithmic tree is a tree where each internal node of height 1, the tree layer above the leaves, has two children, and each internal node of height $h > 1$ has $2^{2^{h-2}}$ children. Each child of the root contains $\sqrt{n}$ leaves. The number of children at a node from each leaf to root is 0,2,2,4,16, 256, 65536, ... (sequence A001146 in the OEIS)

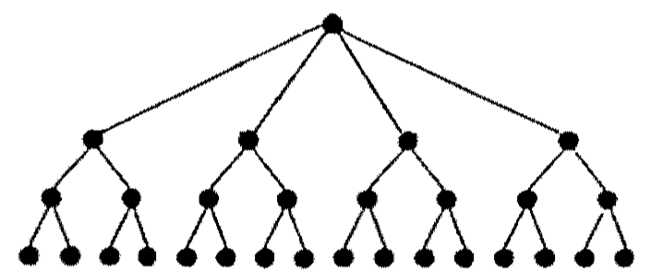
A double log tree

A similar tree called a k-merger is used in Prokop et al.'s cache oblivious Funnelsort to merge elements.
