= Lollipop graph =

Type of graph in mathematical graph theory

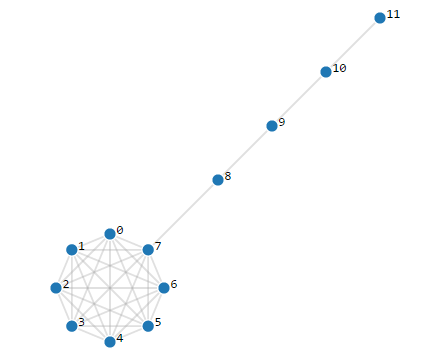
- A (8,4)-lollipop graph
- Vertices: $m+n$
- Edges: $\tbinom m2 + n$
- Girth: $\left\{\begin{array}{ll}\infty & m \le 2\\ 3 & \text{otherwise}\end{array}\right.$
- Properties: connected
- Notation: $L_{m,n}$

In the mathematical discipline of graph theory, the (m,n)-lollipop graph is a special type of graph consisting of a complete graph (clique) on m vertices and a path graph on n vertices, connected with a bridge.

The special case of the (2n/3,n/3)-lollipop graphs are known to be graphs which achieve the maximum possible hitting time, cover time and commute time.

== See also ==
- Barbell graph
- Tadpole graph
