= Parallel external memory =

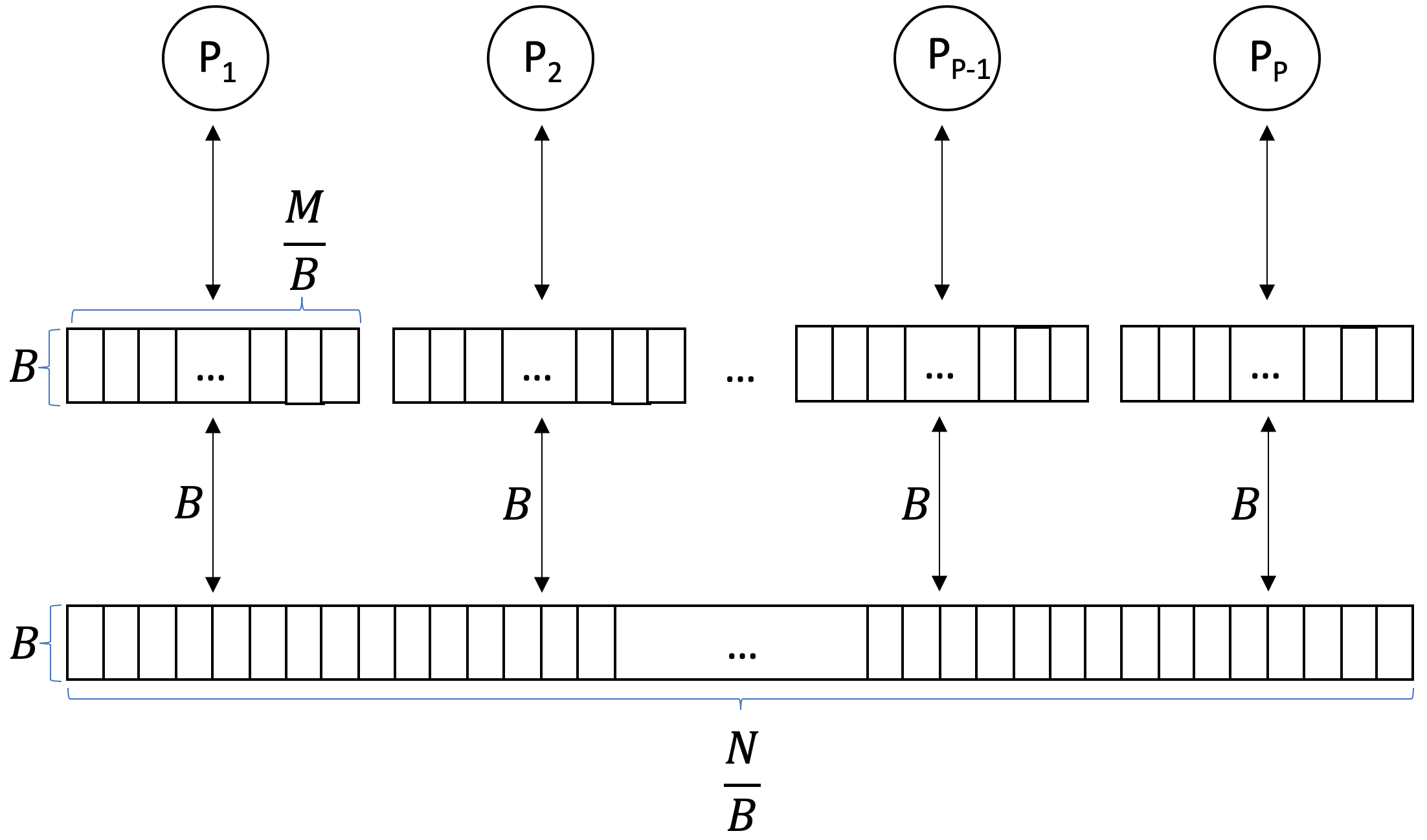
PEM Model

In computer science, a parallel external memory (PEM) model is a cache-aware, external-memory abstract machine. It is the parallel-computing analogy to the single-processor external memory (EM) model. In a similar way, it is the cache-aware analogy to the parallel random-access machine (PRAM). The PEM model consists of a number of processors, together with their respective private caches and a shared main memory.

== Model ==
=== Definition ===
The PEM model is a combination of the EM model and the PRAM model. The PEM model is a computation model which consists of $P$ processors and a two-level memory hierarchy. This memory hierarchy consists of a large external memory (main memory) of size $N$ and $P$ small internal memories (caches). The processors share the main memory. Each cache is exclusive to a single processor. A processor can't access another’s cache. The caches have a size $M$ which is partitioned in blocks of size $B$. The processors can only perform operations on data which are in their cache. The data can be transferred between the main memory and the cache in blocks of size $B$.

=== I/O complexity ===
The complexity measure of the PEM model is the I/O complexity, which determines the number of parallel blocks transfers between the main memory and the cache. During a parallel block transfer each processor can transfer a block. So if $P$ processors load parallelly a data block of size $B$ form the main memory into their caches, it is considered as an I/O complexity of $O(1)$ not $O(P)$. A program in the PEM model should minimize the data transfer between main memory and caches and operate as much as possible on the data in the caches.

=== Read/write conflicts ===
In the PEM model, there is no direct communication network between the P processors. The processors have to communicate indirectly over the main memory. If multiple processors try to access the same block in main memory concurrently read/write conflicts occur. Like in the PRAM model, three different variations of this problem are considered:

- Concurrent Read Concurrent Write (CRCW): The same block in main memory can be read and written by multiple processors concurrently.
- Concurrent Read Exclusive Write (CREW): The same block in main memory can be read by multiple processors concurrently. Only one processor can write to a block at a time.
- Exclusive Read Exclusive Write (EREW): The same block in main memory cannot be read or written by multiple processors concurrently. Only one processor can access a block at a time.

The following two algorithms solve the CREW and EREW problem if $P \leq B$ processors write to the same block simultaneously. A first approach is to serialize the write operations. Only one processor after the other writes to the block. This results in a total of $P$ parallel block transfers. A second approach needs $O(\log(P))$ parallel block transfers and an additional block for each processor. The main idea is to schedule the write operations in a binary tree fashion and gradually combine the data into a single block. In the first round $P$ processors combine their blocks into $P/2$ blocks. Then $P/2$ processors combine the $P/2$ blocks into $P/4$. This procedure is continued until all the data is combined in one block.

=== Comparison to other models ===
Model	Multi-core	Cache-aware
Random-access machine (RAM)	No	No
Parallel random-access machine (PRAM)	Yes	No
External memory (EM)	No	Yes
Parallel external memory (PEM)	Yes	Yes

== Examples ==
=== Multiway partitioning ===
Let $M=\{m_1,...,m_{d-1}\}$ be a vector of d-1 pivots sorted in increasing order. Let A be an unordered set of N elements. A d-way partition of A is a set $\Pi=\{A_1,...,A_d\}$ , where $\cup_{i=1}^d A_i = A$ and $A_i\cap A_j=\emptyset$ for $1\leq i<j\leq d$. $A_i$ is called the i-th bucket. The number of elements in $A_i$ is greater than $m_{i-1}$ and smaller than $m_{i}^2$. In the following algorithm the input is partitioned into N/P-sized contiguous segments $S_1,...,S_P$ in main memory. The processor i primarily works on the segment $S_i$. The multiway partitioning algorithm (PEM_DIST_SORT) uses a PEM prefix sum algorithm to calculate the prefix sum with the optimal $O\left(\frac{N}{PB} + \log P\right)$ I/O complexity. This algorithm simulates an optimal PRAM prefix sum algorithm.

// Compute parallelly a d-way partition on the data segments 
  
    
      
        
          S
          
            i
          
        
      
    
    {\displaystyle S_{i}}
  

for each processor i in parallel do
    Read the vector of pivots M into the cache.
    Partition 
  
    
      
        
          S
          
            i
          
        
      
    
    {\displaystyle S_{i}}
  
 into d buckets and let vector 
  
    
      
        
          M
          
            i
          
        
        =
        {
        
          j
          
            1
          
          
            i
          
        
        ,
        .
        .
        .
        ,
        
          j
          
            d
          
          
            i
          
        
        }
      
    
    {\displaystyle M_{i}=\{j_{1}^{i},...,j_{d}^{i}\}}
  
 be the number of items in each bucket.
end for

Run PEM prefix sum on the set of vectors 
  
    
      
        {
        
          M
          
            1
          
        
        ,
        .
        .
        .
        ,
        
          M
          
            P
          
        
        }
      
    
    {\displaystyle \{M_{1},...,M_{P}\}}
  
 simultaneously.

// Use the prefix sum vector to compute the final partition
for each processor i in parallel do
    Write elements 
  
    
      
        
          S
          
            i
          
        
      
    
    {\displaystyle S_{i}}
  
 into memory locations offset appropriately by 
  
    
      
        
          M
          
            i
            −
            1
          
        
      
    
    {\displaystyle M_{i-1}}
  
 and 
  
    
      
        
          M
          
            i
          
        
      
    
    {\displaystyle M_{i}}
  
.
end for

Using the prefix sums stored in 
  
    
      
        
          M
          
            P
          
        
      
    
    {\displaystyle M_{P}}
  
 the last processor P calculates the vector B of bucket sizes and returns it.

If the vector of $d=O\left(\frac{M}{B}\right)$ pivots M and the input set A are located in contiguous memory, then the d-way partitioning problem can be solved in the PEM model with $O\left(\frac{N}{PB} + \left\lceil \frac{d}{B} \right\rceil>\log(P)+d\log(B)\right)$ I/O complexity. The content of the final buckets have to be located in contiguous memory.

=== Selection ===
The selection problem is about finding the k-th smallest item in an unordered list A of size N. The following code makes use of PRAMSORT which is a PRAM optimal sorting algorithm which runs in $O(\log N)$, and SELECT, which is a cache optimal single-processor selection algorithm.

if 
  
    
      
        N
        ≤
        P
      
    
    {\displaystyle N\leq P}
  
 then 
    
  
    
      
        
          
            PRAMSORT
          
        
        (
        A
        ,
        P
        )
      
    
    {\displaystyle {\texttt {PRAMSORT}}(A,P)}
  

    return 
  
    
      
        A
        [
        k
        ]
      
    
    {\displaystyle A[k]}
  

end if 

//Find median of each 
  
    
      
        
          S
          
            i
          
        
      
    
    {\displaystyle S_{i}}
  

for each processor i in parallel do 
    
  
    
      
        
          m
          
            i
          
        
        =
        
          
            SELECT
          
        
        (
        
          S
          
            i
          
        
        ,
        
          
            N
            
              2
              P
            
          
        
        )
      
    
    {\displaystyle m_{i}={\texttt {SELECT}}(S_{i},{\frac {N}{2P}})}
  

end for 

// Sort medians

  
    
      
        
          
            PRAMSORT
          
        
        (
        {
        
          m
          
            1
          
        
        ,
        …
        ,
        
          m
          
            2
          
        
        }
        ,
        P
        )
      
    
    {\displaystyle {\texttt {PRAMSORT}}(\lbrace m_{1},\dots ,m_{2}\rbrace ,P)}
  


// Partition around median of medians

  
    
      
        t
        =
        
          
            PEMPARTITION
          
        
        (
        A
        ,
        
          m
          
            P
            
              /
            
            2
          
        
        ,
        P
        )
      
    
    {\displaystyle t={\texttt {PEMPARTITION}}(A,m_{P/2},P)}
  


if 
  
    
      
        k
        ≤
        t
      
    
    {\displaystyle k\leq t}
  
 then 
    return 
  
    
      
        
          
            PEMSELECT
          
        
        (
        A
        [
        1
        :
        t
        ]
        ,
        P
        ,
        k
        )
      
    
    {\displaystyle {\texttt {PEMSELECT}}(A[1:t],P,k)}
  

else 
    return 
  
    
      
        
          
            PEMSELECT
          
        
        (
        A
        [
        t
        +
        1
        :
        N
        ]
        ,
        P
        ,
        k
        −
        t
        )
      
    
    {\displaystyle {\texttt {PEMSELECT}}(A[t+1:N],P,k-t)}
  

end if

Under the assumption that the input is stored in contiguous memory, PEMSELECT has an I/O complexity of:

$$O\left(\frac{N}{PB} + \log (PB) \cdot \log(\frac{N}{P})\right)$$

=== Distribution sort ===
Distribution sort partitions an input list A of size N into d disjoint buckets of similar size. Every bucket is then sorted recursively and the results are combined into a fully sorted list.

If $P = 1$ the task is delegated to a cache-optimal single-processor sorting algorithm.

Otherwise the following algorithm is used:

// Sample 
  
    
      
        
          
            
              
                4
                N
              
              
                d
              
            
          
        
      
    
    {\displaystyle {\tfrac {4N}{\sqrt {d}}}}
  
 elements from A
for each processor i in parallel do
    if 
  
    
      
        M
        <
        
          |
        
        
          S
          
            i
          
        
        
          |
        
      
    
    {\displaystyle M<|S_{i}|}
  
 then
        
  
    
      
        d
        =
        M
        
          /
        
        B
      
    
    {\displaystyle d=M/B}
  

        Load 
  
    
      
        
          S
          
            i
          
        
      
    
    {\displaystyle S_{i}}
  
 in M-sized pages and sort pages individually
    else
        
  
    
      
        d
        =
        
          |
        
        
          S
          
            i
          
        
        
          |
        
      
    
    {\displaystyle d=|S_{i}|}
  

        Load and sort 
  
    
      
        
          S
          
            i
          
        
      
    
    {\displaystyle S_{i}}
  
 as single page
    end if
    Pick every 
  
    
      
        
          
            d
          
        
        
          /
        
        4
      
    
    {\displaystyle {\sqrt {d}}/4}
  
'th element from each sorted memory page into contiguous vector 
  
    
      
        
          R
          
            i
          
        
      
    
    {\displaystyle R^{i}}
  
 of samples
end for 

in parallel do
    Combine vectors 
  
    
      
        
          R
          
            1
          
        
        …
        
          R
          
            P
          
        
      
    
    {\displaystyle R^{1}\dots R^{P}}
  
 into a single contiguous vector 
  
    
      
        
          
            R
          
        
      
    
    {\displaystyle {\mathcal {R}}}
  

    Make 
  
    
      
        
          
            d
          
        
      
    
    {\displaystyle {\sqrt {d}}}
  
 copies of 
  
    
      
        
          
            R
          
        
      
    
    {\displaystyle {\mathcal {R}}}
  
: 
  
    
      
        
          
            
              R
            
          
          
            1
          
        
        …
        
          
            
              R
            
          
          
            
              d
            
          
        
      
    
    {\displaystyle {\mathcal {R}}_{1}\dots {\mathcal {R}}_{\sqrt {d}}}
  

end do

// Find 
  
    
      
        
          
            d
          
        
      
    
    {\displaystyle {\sqrt {d}}}
  
 pivots 
  
    
      
        
          
            M
          
        
        [
        j
        ]
      
    
    {\displaystyle {\mathcal {M}}[j]}
  

for 
  
    
      
        j
        =
        1
      
    
    {\displaystyle j=1}
  
 to 
  
    
      
        
          
            d
          
        
      
    
    {\displaystyle {\sqrt {d}}}
  
 in parallel do
    
  
    
      
        
          
            M
          
        
        [
        j
        ]
        =
        
          
            PEMSELECT
          
        
        (
        
          
            
              R
            
          
          
            i
          
        
        ,
        
          
            
              P
              
                d
              
            
          
        
        ,
        
          
            
              
                j
                ⋅
                4
                N
              
              d
            
          
        
        )
      
    
    {\displaystyle {\mathcal {M}}[j]={\texttt {PEMSELECT}}({\mathcal {R}}_{i},{\tfrac {P}{\sqrt {d}}},{\tfrac {j\cdot 4N}{d}})}
  

end for

Pack pivots in contiguous array 
  
    
      
        
          
            M
          
        
      
    
    {\displaystyle {\mathcal {M}}}
  


// Partition Aaround pivots into buckets 
  
    
      
        
          
            B
          
        
      
    
    {\displaystyle {\mathcal {B}}}
  


  
    
      
        
          
            B
          
        
        =
        
          
            PEMMULTIPARTITION
          
        
        (
        A
        [
        1
        :
        N
        ]
        ,
        
          
            M
          
        
        ,
        
          
            d
          
        
        ,
        P
        )
      
    
    {\displaystyle {\mathcal {B}}={\texttt {PEMMULTIPARTITION}}(A[1:N],{\mathcal {M}},{\sqrt {d}},P)}
  


// Recursively sort buckets
for 
  
    
      
        j
        =
        1
      
    
    {\displaystyle j=1}
  
 to 
  
    
      
        
          
            d
          
        
        +
        1
      
    
    {\displaystyle {\sqrt {d}}+1}
  
 in parallel do
    recursively call 
  
    
      
        
          
            PEMDISTSORT
          
        
      
    
    {\displaystyle {\texttt {PEMDISTSORT}}}
  
 on bucket jof size 
  
    
      
        
          
            B
          
        
        [
        j
        ]
      
    
    {\displaystyle {\mathcal {B}}[j]}
  

    using 
  
    
      
        O
        
          (
          
            ⌈
            
              
                
                  
                    
                      
                        B
                      
                    
                    [
                    j
                    ]
                  
                  
                    N
                    
                      /
                    
                    P
                  
                
              
            
            ⌉
          
          )
        
      
    
    {\displaystyle O\left(\left\lceil {\tfrac {{\mathcal {B}}[j]}{N/P}}\right\rceil \right)}
  
 processors responsible for elements in bucket j
end for

The I/O complexity of PEMDISTSORT is:

$$O \left( \left \lceil \frac{N}{PB} \right \rceil \left ( \log_d P + \log_{M/B} \frac{N}{PB} \right ) + f(N,P,d) \cdot \log_d P \right)$$

where

$$f(N,P,d) = O \left ( \log \frac{PB}{\sqrt{d}} \log \frac{N}{P} + \left \lceil \frac{\sqrt{d}}{B} \log P + \sqrt{d} \log B \right \rceil \right )$$

If the number of processors is chosen that $f(N,P,d) = O\left ( \left \lceil \tfrac{N}{PB} \right \rceil \right )$and $M < B^{O(1)}$ the I/O complexity is then:

$O \left ( \frac{N}{PB} \log_{M/B} \frac{N}{B} \right )$

=== Other PEM algorithms ===
PEM Algorithm	I/O complexity	Constraints
Mergesort	$O\left(\frac{N}{PB} \log_{\frac{M}{B}} \frac{N}{B}\right) = \textrm{sort}_P(N)$	$P \leq \frac{N}{B^2}, M = B^{O(1)}$
List ranking	$O \left ( \textrm{sort}_P(N) \right )$	$P \leq \frac{N/B^2}{\log B \cdot \log^{O(1)} N}, M = B^{O(1)}$
Euler tour	$O \left ( \textrm{sort}_P(N) \right )$	$P \leq \frac{N}{B^2}, M = B^{O(1)}$
Expression tree evaluation	$O \left ( \textrm{sort}_P(N) \right )$	$P \leq \frac{N}{B^2 \log B \cdot \log^{O(1)}N}, M = B^{O(1)}$
Finding a MST	$O \left(\textrm{sort}_P(|V|) + \textrm{sort}_P(|E|) \log \tfrac{|V|}{pB} \right)$	$p \leq \frac{|V|+|E|}{B^2 \log B \cdot \log^{O(1)} N}, M = B^{O(1)}$

Where $\textrm{sort}_P(N)$ is the time it takes to sort N items with P processors in the PEM model.

== See also ==
- Parallel random-access machine (PRAM)
- Random-access machine (RAM)
- External memory (EM)
