= Tadpole graph =

- A (5,3)-tadpole graph.
- Vertices: $m+n$
- Edges: $m+n$
- Girth: $m$
- Properties: connected planar
- Notation: $T_{m,n}$

In the mathematical discipline of graph theory, the (m,n)-tadpole graph is a special type of graph consisting of a cycle graph on m (at least 3) vertices and a path graph on n vertices, connected with a bridge.

== Named variants ==
Name	$(m,n)$	Image
Paw graph	$(3,1)$	
Banner graph	$(4,1)$	

== See also ==
- Barbell graph
- Lollipop graph
