= Harald Prokop =

- Education: Massachusetts Institute of Technology
- Scientific career
- Academic advisors: Charles E. Leiserson

Harald Prokop is the Chief Technical Officer of SCVNGR, parent company of LevelUp, as of April 2012. Currently he works at Just Appraised.

He worked at Akamai Technologies from 1999 to 2012, where he was Senior Vice President of Engineering and is also known for having elucidated the concept of the cache-oblivious algorithm.
