= Proportion extend sort =

In-place, comparison-based sorting algorithm

- Class: Sorting algorithm
- Data structure: Array
- Worst-case performance: O(n log n)
- Best-case performance: O(n log n)
- Average performance: O(n log n)
- Worst-case space complexity: O(log n) auxiliary
- Optimal: Yes

Proportion extend sort (abbreviated as PESort) is an in-place, comparison-based sorting algorithm which attempts to improve on the performance, particularly the worst-case performance, of quicksort.

The basic partitioning operation in quicksort has a linear access pattern which is extremely efficient on modern memory hierarchies, but the performance of the algorithm is critically dependent on the choice of a pivot value. A good pivot will divide the data to be sorted into nearly equal halves. A poor choice will result in a grossly lopsided division, leaving one part almost as large as the original problem and causing O(n^{2}) performance.

Proportion extend sort begins with a sorted prefix of k elements, then uses the median of that sample to partition the following pk elements. By bounding the size ratio p between the sample and the data being partitioned (i.e. the proportion by which the sorted prefix is extended), the imbalance is limited. In this, it has some similarities to samplesort.

== History ==
Proportion extend sort was published by Jing-Chao Chen in 2001 as an improvement on his earlier proportion split sort design. Its average-case performance, which was only experimentally measured in the original paper, was analyzed by Richard Cole and David C. Kandathil in 2004 and by Chen in 2006, and shown to require log_{2}n + O(n) comparisons on average. A slightly refined variant, symmetry partition sort, was published in 2007.

== Algorithm ==
The algorithm begins with an array divided into a sorted part S adjacent to an unsorted part U. (The original proportion extend sort always had the sorted part precede the unsorted part; the symmetric variant allows either order.) It is possible to begin with the first element as the sorted part (a single element is always sorted), or to sort a small number of elements using a simpler insertion sort. The initially sorted elements may also be taken from across the array to improve performance in the case of pre-sorted data.

Next, and most critically, the length of the unsorted part |U| is bounded to a multiple p of the length of the sorted part |S|. Specifically, if |U| > p^{2}|S|, then recursively sort S and the adjacent p|S| elements of U, make the result (p+1 times longer than the original (Note: Note that different sources use different conventions for p: Chen uses the ratio of the unsorted part to the sorted part, so any p>0 makes sense, while others have it as the ratio of the total size to that of the sorted part, so only p>1 makes sense.)) the new S, and repeat until the condition is satisfied.

If there is no limit on the unsorted part (p=∞), then the algorithm is equivalent to quicksort. If the unsorted part is of length 1 (p=0, almost), then the algorithm is equivalent to binary insertion sort. Values around p≈16 give the best average-case performance, competitive with quicksort, while smaller values improve worst-case performance. (Note: The algorithm requires at most 1/log_{2}(1 + 1/(2p^{2}+2p−1)) n log_{2} n comparisons. For p ≤ 16, that constant may be approximated by 1.37p^{2}+1.63p−0.5.)

Eliezer Albacea published a similar algorithm in 1995 called Leapfrogging samplesort where the size is limited so |U| ≤ |S|+1, later generalized to (2^{k}−1)(|S|+1).

The sorted part of the array is divided in half (at the median), and one half is moved (by exchanging it with unsorted elements) to the far end of the array, so we have an initial partially partitioned array of the form LUR, where L is the left half of the sorted part, U is the bounded-length unsorted part, and R is the right half of the sorted part.

Then the standard quicksort partitioning step is performed on U, dividing it (in place) into U_{L} and U_{R}. U_{L} and U_{R} are not sorted, but every element of U_{L} is less than or equal to the median, and every element of U_{R} is greater or equal. (Note: This assumes an ascending sort. A descending sort requires the obvious adjustments.) The final result LU_{L}U_{R}R consists of two arrays of the necessary form (a sorted part adjacent to an unsorted part) and are sorted recursively.

Leapfrogging samplesort and the original proportion extend sort have the sorted part always precede the unsorted part, achieved by partitioning U before moving R, resulting in LRU_{L}U_{R}, and then exchanging R with the end of U_{L}, resulting in LU_{L}RU_{R}. While the symmetric version is a bit trickier, it has the advantage that the L and R parts act as sentinel values for the partitioning loops, eliminating the need to test in the loop if the bounds of U have been reached.

Most of the implementation refinements used for quicksort can be applied, including techniques for detecting and efficiently handling mostly sorted inputs. In particular, sub-sorts below a certain size threshold are usually implemented using a simple insertion sort.

As with quicksort, the number of recursive levels can be limited to log_{2}n if the smaller sub-sort is done first and the larger is implemented as a tail call. Unlike quicksort, the number of levels is bounded by O(log n) even if this is not done.
