= Spill metric =

Register allocators' register-spill-deciding heuristic metric

A spill metric is a heuristic metric used by register allocators to decide which registers to spill. Popular spill metrics are:

- cost / degree - introduced in Chaitin's algorithm
- cost / degree^{2} - emphasizes the spill's effect on neighbours
- cost - emphasizes run time
- minimising number of spill operations

Where cost is the estimated cost of spilling a value from registers into memory.
