= Goal node (computer science) =

In computer science, a goal node is a node in a graph that meets defined criteria for success or termination.

Heuristical artificial intelligence algorithms, like A* and B*, attempt to reach such nodes in optimal time by defining the distance to the goal node. When the goal node is reached, A* defines the distance to the goal node as 0 and all other nodes' distances as positive values.

== See also ==
- Tree traversal
