= Ari Holtzman =

Professor of computer science

Ari Holtzman is an assistant professor of Computer Science at the University of Chicago and an expert in the area of natural language processing and computational linguistics. Previously, Holtzman was a PhD student at the University of Washington where he was advised by Luke Zettlemoyer.

In 2017, he was a member of the winning team for the inaugural Alexa Prize for developing a conversational AI system for the Amazon Alexa device. Holtzman has made multiple contributions in the area of text generation and language models such as the introduction of nucleus sampling in 2019, his work on AI safety and neural fake news detection, and the fine-tuning of quantized large language models.
