= GrowCut algorithm =

GrowCut is an interactive segmentation algorithm. It uses Cellular Automaton as an image model. Automata evolution models segmentation process. Each cell of the automata has some label (in case of binary segmentation - 'object', 'background' and 'empty'). During automata evolution some cells capture their neighbours, replacing their labels.

In GrowCut, a user vaguely draws some strokes inside the object of interest with an object brush, and outside the object with a background brush. In simple cases, only a few strokes suffice for segmentation.
