= Zhu–Takaoka string matching algorithm =

In computer science, the Zhu–Takaoka string matching algorithm is a variant of the Boyer–Moore string-search algorithm. It uses two consecutive text characters to compute the bad-character shift. It is faster when the alphabet or pattern is small, but the skip table grows quickly, slowing the pre-processing phase.
