= WACA clustering algorithm =

Algorithm

WACA is a clustering algorithm for dynamic networks. WACA (Weighted Application-aware Clustering Algorithm) uses a heuristic weight function for self-organized cluster creation. The election of clusterheads is based on local network information only.
