= Manning criteria =

- Purpose: diagnosis of irritable bowel syndrome

The Manning criteria are a diagnostic algorithm used in the diagnosis of irritable bowel syndrome (IBS). The criteria consist of a list of questions the physician can ask the patient. The answers are used in a process to produce a diagnostic decision regarding whether the patient can be considered to have IBS.

The Manning criteria have been compared with other diagnostic algorithms for IBS, such as the Rome I criteria, the Rome II process, and the Kruis criteria. A 2013 validation study found the Manning criteria to have less sensitivity but more specificity than the Rome criteria.

The threshold for a positive diagnosis varies from two to four of the Manning criteria below.

1. Onset of pain linked to more frequent bowel movements
2. Looser stools associated with onset of pain
3. Pain relieved by passage of stool
4. Noticeable abdominal bloating
5. Sensation of incomplete evacuation more than 25% of the time
6. Diarrhea with mucus more than 25% of the time
