= Richard Korf =

Richard Korf may refer to:

- Richard E. Korf, American computer scientist
- Richard P. Korf (1925–2016), American mycologist
