= QTM =

QTM may refer to:

- QTM, a radiotelephony navigational Q code
- Quantity theory of money
- Quantum Turing machine
- quarter-turn metric, a measurement used in puzzle cube analysis, see Optimal solutions for the Rubik's Cube
- quaternary triangular mesh, a method to build a geodesic grid
- Quantum Corporation (NYSE stock ticker: QTM), see Companies listed on the New York Stock Exchange (Q)
- Quantum Air (IATA airline code: QO; ICAO airline code: QTM)
