= Fringe search =

Graph search algorithm

In computer science, fringe search is a graph search algorithm that finds the least-cost path from a given initial node to one goal node.

In essence, fringe search is a middle ground between A* and the iterative deepening A* variant (IDA*).

If g(x) is the cost of the search path from the first node to the current, and h(x) is the heuristic estimate of the cost from the current node to the goal, then ƒ(x) = g(x) + h(x), and h* is the actual path cost to the goal. Consider IDA*, which does a recursive left-to-right depth-first search from the root node, stopping the recursion once the goal has been found or the nodes have reached a maximum value ƒ. If no goal is found in the first threshold ƒ, the threshold is then increased and the algorithm searches again. I.E. It iterates on the threshold.

There are three major inefficiencies with IDA*. First, IDA* will repeat states when there are multiple (sometimes non-optimal) paths to a goal node - this is often solved by keeping a cache of visited states. IDA* thus altered is denoted as memory-enhanced IDA* (ME-IDA*), since it uses some storage. Furthermore, IDA* repeats all previous operations in a search when it iterates in a new threshold, which is necessary to operate with no storage. By storing the leaf nodes of a previous iteration and using them as the starting position of the next, IDA*'s efficiency is significantly improved (otherwise, in the last iteration it would always have to visit every node in the tree).

Fringe search implements these improvements on IDA* by making use of a data structure that is more or less two lists to iterate over the frontier or fringe of the search tree. One list now, stores the current iteration, and the other list later stores the immediate next iteration. So from the root node of the search tree, now will be the root and later will be empty. Then the algorithm takes one of two actions: If ƒ(head) is greater than the current threshold, remove head from now and append it to the end of later; i.e. save head for the next iteration. Otherwise, if ƒ(head) is less than or equal to the threshold, expand head and discard head, consider its children, adding them to the beginning of now. At the end of an iteration, the threshold is increased, the later list becomes the now list, and later is emptied.

An important difference here between fringe and A* is that the contents of the lists in fringe do not necessarily have to be sorted - a significant gain over A*, which requires the often expensive maintenance of order in its open list. Unlike A*, however, fringe will have to visit the same nodes repeatedly, but the cost for each such visit is constant compared to the worst-case logarithmic time of sorting the list in A*.

== Pseudocode ==
Implementing both lists in one doubly linked list, where nodes that precede the current node are the later portion and all else are the now list. Using an array of pre-allocated nodes in the list for each node in the grid, access time to nodes in the list is reduced to a constant. Similarly, a marker array allows lookup of a node in the list to be done in constant time. g is stored as a hash-table, and a last marker array is stored for constant-time lookup of whether or not a node has been visited before and if a cache entry is valid.

init(start, goal)
    fringe F = s
    cache C[start] = (0, null)
    flimit = h(start)
    found = false

    while (found == false) AND (F not empty)
        fmin = ∞
        for node in F, from left to right
            (g, parent) = C[node]
            f = g + h(node)
            if f > flimit
                fmin = min(f, fmin)
                continue
            if node == goal
                found = true
                break
            for child in children(node), from right to left
                g_child = g + cost(node, child)
                if C[child] != null
                    (g_cached, parent) = C[child]
                    if g_child >= g_cached
                        continue
                if child in F
                    remove child from F
                insert child in F past node
                C[child] = (g_child, node)
            remove node from F
        flimit = fmin

    if reachedgoal == true
        reverse_path(goal)

Reverse pseudo-code.

reverse_path(node)
    (g, parent) = C[node]
    if parent != null
        reverse_path(parent)
    print node

== Experiments ==
When tested on grid-based environments typical of computer games including impassable obstacles, fringe outperformed A* by some 10 percent to 40 percent, depending on use of tiles or octiles. Possible further improvements include use of a data structure that lends itself more easily to caches.
