= Fringe =

Fringe may refer to:

== Arts and music ==
- "The Fringe", or Edinburgh Festival Fringe, the world's largest arts festival
- Adelaide Fringe, the world's second-largest annual arts festival
- Fringe theatre, a name for alternative theatre
- Purple fringing, an unfocused purple or magenta "ghost" image on a photograph
- Fringe Product, a defunct Canadian record label

== Television and entertainment ==
- Fringe (TV series), an American science fiction television series
- The Fringe, the setting for the 2000 computer game Tachyon: The Fringe
- "The Fringe" (short story), a short story by Orson Scott Card
- "The Fringe" (Smash), a television episode

== Science ==
- Fringe science, scientific inquiry that departs significantly from mainstream or orthodox theories in an established field of study
- Fringe search, a graph search algorithm that finds the least-cost path from a given initial node to one goal node
- Fringe of a relation, a particular sub-relation of a binary relation in mathematics
- Interference fringe, a pattern in wave interference
- Chionanthus (common name: fringetrees), a genus of about 150 species of flowering plants in the family Oleaceae

== Other uses ==
- Fringe (hair), strands or locks of hair that fall over the scalp's front hairline to cover the forehead
- Fringe (trim), an ornamental textile trim applied to an edge of a textile item
- Fringe culture, another name for counterculture
- Fringe party, a political party in a national spectrum with a negligible share of the electorate
- Fringe theory, an idea or a collection of ideas that departs significantly from the prevailing or mainstream view in its particular field of study
