= Stentz =

Stentz may refer to:

- Zack Stentz, one of the scriptwriters of 2003 film Agent Cody Banks
- Stentz is an official codename for Fedora Core release 4
- Stentz's Algorithm
