= Rubik's Cube group =

Mathematical group

The manipulations of the Rubik's Cube form the Rubik's Cube group.

The Rubik's Cube group $(G, \cdot )$ represents the mathematical structure of the Rubik's Cube mechanical puzzle. Each element of the set $G$ corresponds to a cube move, which is the effect of any sequence of rotations of the cube's faces. With this representation, not only can any cube move be represented, but any position of the cube as well, by detailing the cube moves required to rotate the solved cube into that position. Indeed, with the solved position as a starting point, there is a one-to-one correspondence between each of the legal positions of the Rubik's Cube and the elements of $G$. The group operation $\cdot$ is the composition of cube moves, corresponding to the result of performing one cube move after another.

The Rubik's Cube is constructed by labeling each of the 48 non-center facets with the integers 1 to 48. Each configuration of the cube can be represented as a permutation of the labels 1 to 48, depending on the position of each facet. Using this representation, the solved cube is the identity permutation which leaves the cube unchanged, while the twelve cube moves that rotate a layer of the cube 90 degrees are represented by their respective permutations. The Rubik's Cube group is the subgroup of the symmetric group $\mathrm{S}_{48}$ generated by the six permutations corresponding to the six clockwise cube moves. With this construction, any configuration of the cube reachable through a sequence of cube moves is within the group. Its operation $\cdot$ refers to the composition of two permutations; within the cube, this refers to combining two sequences of cube moves together, doing one after the other. The Rubik's Cube group is non-abelian as composition of cube moves is not commutative; doing a sequence of cube moves in a different order can result in a different configuration.

== Cube moves ==
A $3 \times 3 \times 3$ Rubik's Cube consists of $6$ faces, each with $9$ colored squares called facelets, for a total of $54$ facelets. A solved cube has all of the facelets on each face having the same color.

A cube move rotates one of the $6$ faces either $90^\circ , 180^\circ,$ or $-90^\circ$ (half-turn metric). A center facelet rotates about its axis but otherwise stays in the same position.

Cube moves are described with the Singmaster notation:

Basic 90°	180°	-90°
$F$ turns the front clockwise	$F^2$ turns the front clockwise twice	$F^\prime$ turns the front counter-clockwise
$B$ turns the back clockwise	$B^2$ turns the back clockwise twice	$B^\prime$ turns the back counter-clockwise
$U$ turns the top clockwise	$U^2$ turns the top clockwise twice	$U^\prime$ turns the top counter-clockwise
$D$ turns the bottom clockwise	$D^2$ turns the bottom clockwise twice	$D^\prime$ turns the bottom counter-clockwise
$L$ turns the left face clockwise	$L^2$ turns the left face clockwise twice	$L^\prime$ turns the left face counter-clockwise
$R$ turns the right face clockwise	$R^2$ turns the right face clockwise twice	$R^\prime$ turns the right face counter-clockwise

The empty move is $E$. (Note: Not to be confused with $E$ as used in the extended Singmaster Notation, where it represents a quarter-turn of the equator layer (i.e., the central layer between $U$ and $D$), in the same direction as $D$.) The concatenation $LLLL$ is the same as $E$, and $RRR$ is the same as $R^\prime$.

== Group structure ==
The following uses the notation described in How to solve the Rubik's Cube. The orientation of the six centre facelets is fixed.

We can identify each of the six face rotations as elements in the symmetric group on the set of non-center facelets. More concretely, we can label the non-center facelets by the numbers 1 through 48, and then identify the six face rotations as elements of the symmetric group S_{48} according to how each move permutes the various facelets. The Rubik's Cube group, G, is then defined to be the subgroup of S_{48} generated by the 6 face rotations, $\{F,B,U,D,L,R\}$.

The cardinality of G is given by:

$|G| = 43{,}252{,}003{,}274{,}489{,}856{,}000$${} = \frac{12! \cdot 8!}{2} \cdot \frac{2^{12}}{2} \cdot \frac{3^8}{3}$${} = 2^{27} 3^{14} 5^3 7^2 11$

Despite being this large, God's number for Rubik's Cube is 20; that is, any position can be solved in 20 or fewer moves (where a half-twist is counted as a single move; if a half-twist is counted as two quarter-twists, then God's number is 26).

The largest order of an element in G is 1260. For example, one such element of order 1260 is

$(RU^2D^{-1}BD^{-1})$.

G is non-abelian (that is, not all cube moves commute with each other) since, for example, $FR$ is not the same as $RF$. The center of G consists of only two elements: the identity (i.e. the solved state), and the superflip.

=== Subgroups ===
We consider two subgroups of G: First the subgroup C_{o} of cube orientations, the moves that leave the position of every block fixed, but can change the orientations of blocks. This group is a normal subgroup of G. It can be represented as the normal closure of some moves that flip a few edges or twist a few corners. For example, it is the normal closure of the following two moves:

$B R^\prime D^2 R B^\prime U^2 B R^\prime D^2 R B^\prime U^2,$ (twist two corners)
$R U D B^2 U^2 B^\prime U B U B^2 D^\prime R^\prime U^\prime,$ (flip two edges).

Second, we take the subgroup $C_\text{p}$ of cube permutations, the moves which can change the positions of the blocks, but leave the orientation fixed. For this subgroup there are several choices, depending on the precise way 'orientation' is defined. (Note: One way of defining orientation is as follows, adapted from pages 314–315 of Metamagical Themas by Douglas Hofstadter. Define two notions: the chief color of a block and the chief facet of a position, where a position means the location of a block. The chief facet of a position will be the one on the front or back face of the cube, if that position has such a facet; otherwise it will be the one on the left or right face. There are nine chief facelets on F, nine on B, two on L, and two on R. The chief color of a block is defined as the color that should be on the block's chief facet when the block "comes home" to its proper position in a solved cube. A cube move $X$ preserves orientation if, when $X$ has been applied to a solved cube, the chief color of every block is on the chief facet of its position.) One choice is the following group, given by generators (the last generator is a 3 cycle on the edges):

$$C_\text{p} = [U^2, D^2, F, B, L^2, R^2, R^2 U^\prime F B^\prime R^2 F^\prime B U^\prime R^2].$$

Since C_{o} is a normal subgroup and the intersection of C_{o} and C_{p} is the identity and their product is the whole cube group, it follows that the cube group G is the semi-direct product of these two groups. That is

$$G = C_\text{o} \rtimes C_\text{p} .$$

Next we can take a closer look at these two groups. The structure of C_{o} is

$$\mathrm{Z}_3^7 \times \mathrm{Z}_2^{11},$$

since the group of rotations of each corner (resp. edge) cube is $\mathrm{Z}_3$ (resp. $\mathrm{Z}_2$), and in each case all but one may be rotated freely, but these rotations determine the orientation of the last one. Noticing that there are 8 corners and 12 edges, and that all the rotation groups are abelian, gives the above structure.

Cube permutations, C_{p}, is a little more complicated. It has the following two disjoint normal subgroups: the group of even permutations on the corners A_{8} and the group of even permutations on the edges A_{12}. Complementary to these two subgroups is a permutation that swaps two corners and swaps two edges. It turns out that these generate all possible permutations, which means

$$C_\text{p} = (\mathrm{A}_8 \times \mathrm{A}_{12})\, \rtimes \mathrm{Z}_2.$$

Putting all the pieces together we get that the cube group is isomorphic to

$$(\mathrm{Z}_3^7 \times \mathrm{Z}_2^{11}) \rtimes \,((\mathrm{A}_8 \times \mathrm{A}_{12}) \rtimes \mathrm{Z}_2).$$

This group can also be described as the subdirect product

$$[(\mathrm{Z}_3^7 \rtimes \mathrm{S}_8) \times (\mathrm{Z}_2^{11} \rtimes \mathrm{S}_{12})]^\frac{1}{2},$$

in the notation of Griess.

=== Generalizations ===
When the centre facet symmetries are taken into account, the symmetry group is a subgroup of

$$[\mathrm{Z}_4^6 \times (\mathrm{Z}_3^7 \rtimes \mathrm{S}_8) \times (\mathrm{Z}_2^{11} \rtimes \mathrm{S}_{12})]^\frac{1}{2}.$$

(This unimportance of centre facet rotations is an implicit example of a quotient group at work, shielding the reader from the full automorphism group of the object in question.)

The symmetry group of the Rubik's Cube obtained by disassembling and reassembling it is slightly larger: namely it is the direct product

$$\mathrm{Z}_4^6 \times (\mathrm{Z}_3 \wr \mathrm{S}_8) \times (\mathrm{Z}_2\wr \mathrm{S}_{12}).$$

The first factor is accounted for solely by rotations of the centre pieces, the second solely by symmetries of the corners, and the third solely by symmetries of the edges. The latter two factors are examples of generalized symmetric groups, which are themselves examples of wreath products. (There is no factor for re-arrangements of the center faces, because on virtually all Rubik's Cube models, re-arranging these faces is impossible with a simple disassembly.)

The simple groups that occur as quotients in the composition series of the standard cube group (i.e. ignoring centre piece rotations) are $\mathrm{A}_8$, $\mathrm{A}_{12}$, $\mathrm{Z}_3$ (7 times), and $\mathrm{Z}_2$ (12 times).

=== Conjugacy classes ===
It has been reported that the Rubik's Cube group has 81,120 conjugacy classes. The number was calculated by counting the number of even and odd conjugacy classes in the edge and corner groups separately and then multiplying them, ensuring that the total parity is always even. Special care must be taken to count so-called parity-sensitive conjugacy classes, whose elements always differ when conjugated with any even element versus any odd element.

Number of conjugacy classes in the Rubik's Cube group and various subgroups
Group	No. even	No. odd	No. ps	Total
Corner positions	12	10	2	22
Edge positions	40	37	3	77
All positions				856
Corners	140	130	10	270
Edges	308	291	17	599
Whole cube				81,120

== See also ==
- Commutator
- Conjugacy class
- Coset
- Optimal solutions for Rubik's Cube
- Solvable group
- Thistlethwaite's algorithm
