= Theta* =

Path planning algorithm

Theta* is an any-angle path planning algorithm that is based on the A* search algorithm. It can find near-optimal paths with run times comparable to those of A*.

== Description ==
For the simplest version of Theta*, the main loop is much the same as that of A*. The only difference is the $\text{update} \_ \text{vertex}()$ function. Compared to A*, the parent of a node in Theta* does not have to be a neighbor of the node as long as there is a line-of-sight between the two nodes.

== Pseudocode ==
Adapted from.

function theta*(start, goal)
    // This main loop is the same as A*
    gScore(start) := 0
    parent(start) := start
    // Initializing open and closed sets. The open set is initialized 
    // with the start node and an initial cost
    open := {}
    open.insert(start, gScore(start) + heuristic(start))
    // gScore(node) is the current shortest distance from the start node to node
    // heuristic(node) is the estimated distance of node from the goal node
    // there are many options for the heuristic such as Euclidean or Manhattan 
    closed := {}
    while open is not empty
        s := open.pop()
        if s = goal
            return reconstruct_path(s)
        closed.push(s)
        for each neighbor of s
        // Loop through each immediate neighbor of s
            if neighbor not in closed
                if neighbor not in open
                    // Initialize values for neighbor if it is 
                    // not already in the open list
                    gScore(neighbor) := infinity
                    parent(neighbor) := Null
                update_vertex(s, neighbor)
    return Null
            
    
function update_vertex(s, neighbor)
    // This part of the algorithm is the main difference between A* and Theta*
    if line_of_sight(parent(s), neighbor)
        // If there is line-of-sight between parent(s) and neighbor
        // then ignore s and use the path from parent(s) to neighbor 
        if gScore(parent(s)) + c(parent(s), neighbor) < gScore(neighbor)
            // c(s, neighbor) is the Euclidean distance from s to neighbor
            gScore(neighbor) := gScore(parent(s)) + c(parent(s), neighbor)
            parent(neighbor) := parent(s)
            if neighbor in open
                open.remove(neighbor)
            open.insert(neighbor, gScore(neighbor) + heuristic(neighbor))
    else
        // If the length of the path from start to s and from s to 
        // neighbor is shorter than the shortest currently known distance
        // from start to neighbor, then update node with the new distance
        if gScore(s) + c(s, neighbor) < gScore(neighbor)
            gScore(neighbor) := gScore(s) + c(s, neighbor)
            parent(neighbor) := s
            if neighbor in open
                open.remove(neighbor)
            open.insert(neighbor, gScore(neighbor) + heuristic(neighbor))

function reconstruct_path(s)
    total_path = {s}
    // This will recursively reconstruct the path from the goal node 
    // until the start node is reached
    if parent(s) != s
        total_path.push(reconstruct_path(parent(s)))
    else
        return total_path

=== Line-of-sight algorithm ===
lineOfSight(node1, node2) {
  let x0 = node1.x;
  let y0 = node1.y;
  let x1 = node2.x;
  let y1 = node2.y;
  let dx = abs(x1 - x0);
  let dy = -abs(y1 - y0);

  let sX = -1;
  let sY = -1;
  if (x0 < x1) {
    sX = 1;
  }
  if (y0 < y1) {
    sY = 1;
  }

  let e = dx + dy;
  while (true) {
    let point = getNode(x0, y0);
    if (point does not exist OR point is not walkable) {
      return false;
    }
    if (x0 == x1 AND y0 == y1) {
      return true;
    }
    let e2 = 2 * e;
    if (e2 >= dy) {
      if (x0 == x1) {
        return true;
      }
      e += dy;
      x0 += sX;
    }
    if (e2 <= dx) {
      if (y0 == y1) {
        return true;
      }
      e += dx;
      y0 += sY;
    }
  }
}

== Variants ==
The following variants of the algorithm exist:

- Lazy Theta* – Node expansions are delayed, resulting in fewer line-of-sight checks
- Incremental Phi* – A modification of Theta* that allows for dynamic path planning similar to D*

== See also ==
- Any-angle path planning
- A*
