= SMA* =

SMA* or Simplified Memory Bounded A* is a shortest path algorithm based on the A* algorithm. The main advantage of SMA* is that it uses a bounded memory, while the A* algorithm might need exponential memory. All other characteristics of SMA* are inherited from A*.

== Properties ==
SMA* has the following properties

- It works with a heuristic, just as A*
- It is complete if the allowed memory is high enough to store the shallowest solution
- It is optimal if the allowed memory is high enough to store the shallowest optimal solution, otherwise it will return the best solution that fits in the allowed memory
- It avoids repeated states as long as the memory bound allows it
- It will use all memory available
- Enlarging the memory bound of the algorithm will only speed up the calculation
- When enough memory is available to contain the entire search tree, then calculation has an optimal speed

== Implementation ==
The implementation of Simple memory bounded A* is very similar to that of A*; the only difference is that nodes with the highest f-cost are pruned from the queue when there isn't any space left. Because those nodes are deleted, simple memory bounded A* has to remember the f-cost of the best forgotten child of the parent node. When it seems that all explored paths are worse than such a forgotten path, the path is regenerated.

Pseudo code:

function simple memory bounded A*-star(problem): path
  queue: set of nodes, ordered by f-cost;
begin
  queue.insert(problem.root-node);

  while True do begin
    if queue.empty() then return failure; //there is no solution that fits in the given memory
    node := queue.begin(); // min-f-cost-node
    if problem.is-goal(node) then return success;
    
    s := next-successor(node)
    if !problem.is-goal(s) && depth(s) == max_depth then
        f(s) := inf; 
        // there is no memory left to go past s, so the entire path is useless
    else
        f(s) := max(f(node), g(s) + h(s));
        // f-value of the successor is the maximum of
        //      f-value of the parent and 
        //      heuristic of the successor + path length to the successor
    end if
    if no more successors then
       update f-cost of node and those of its ancestors if needed
    
    if node.successors ⊆ queue then queue.remove(node); 
    // all children have already been added to the queue via a shorter way
    if memory is full then begin
      bad Node := shallowest node with highest f-cost;
      for parent in bad Node.parents do begin
        parent.successors.remove(bad Node);
        if needed then queue.insert(parent); 
      end for
    end if

    queue.insert(s);
  end while
end
