= Sven Koenig (computer scientist) =

German computer scientist

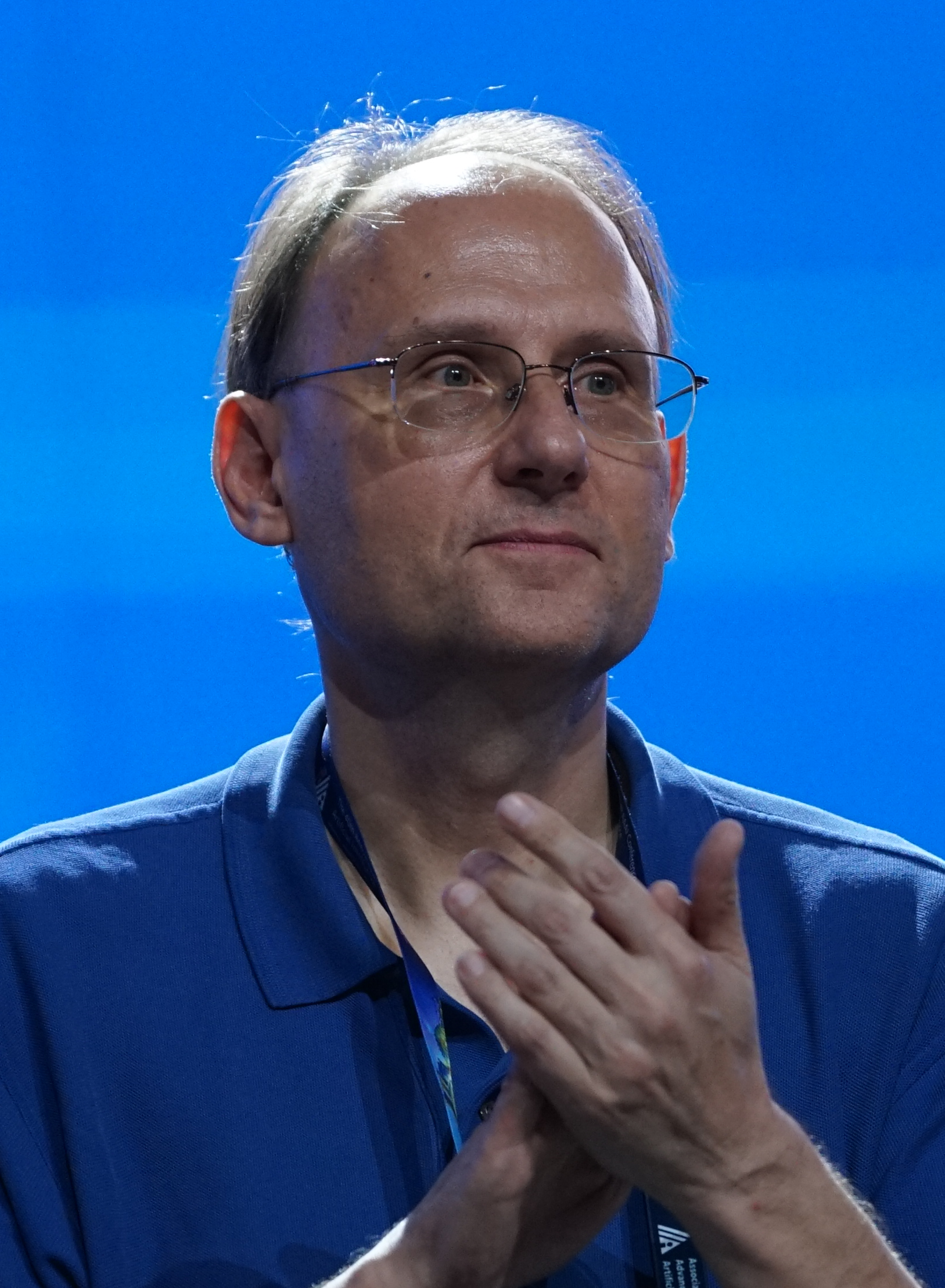
- Koenig at AAAI 2026
- Education: Carnegie Mellon University
- Scientific career
- Fields: Artificial Intelligence, Robotics
- Workplaces: University of California, Irvine
- Doctoral advisor: Reid Simmons

Sven Koenig is Chancellor’s Professor and Bren Chair of the Department of Computer Science at the University of California, Irvine. He received an M.S. degree in computer science from the University of California at Berkeley in 1991 and a Ph.D. in computer science from Carnegie Mellon University in 1997, advised by Reid Simmons.

== Research ==
Koenig is an artificial intelligence and robotics researcher who develops techniques for planning and learning under uncertainty and time constraints, both for single agents and teams of agents. His research often combines ideas from artificial intelligence and robotics with ideas from other disciplines, such as decision theory, theoretical computer science, operations research and economics.

== Scientific achievements ==
In his pre-dissertation work, Koenig applied Markov Decision Processes (MDPs) to artificial intelligence planning. The standard textbook in artificial intelligence, Artificial Intelligence: A Modern Approach (second edition), states "The connection between MDPs and AI planning problems was made first by Sven Koenig (1991), who showed how probabilistic STRIPS operators provide a compact representation for transition models."

Koenig's dissertation on "Goal-Directed Acting with Incomplete Information" describes a robust robot navigation architecture based on partially observable Markov decision process models. His papers on the subject are highly cited due to their pioneering nature and the subsequent wide adoption of probabilistic robot navigation approaches.

After his dissertation, Koenig laid a broad foundation for incremental heuristic search in artificial intelligence with the development of search algorithms such as Lifelong Planning A* (LPA*), D* Lite, Adaptive A* (AA*) and Fringe-Saving A* (FSA*). The ideas behind his incremental heuristic search algorithm D* Lite, for example, have been incorporated by others into a variety of path planning systems in robotics, including Carnegie Mellon University's winning entry in the DARPA Urban Challenge.

Koenig is also known for his work on real-time search, ant robots, probabilistic planning with nonlinear utility functions, development and analysis of robot-navigation methods (goal-directed navigation in unknown terrain, localization, coverage and mapping), agent coordination based on cooperative auctions, and any-angle path planning.

== Professional activities ==
Koenig was conference co-chair of the 2004 International Conference on Automated Planning and Scheduling (ICAPS), program co-chair of the 2005 International Joint Conference on Autonomous Agents and Multi-Agent Systems and program co-chair of the 2007 and 2008 AAAI Nectar programs. He served or serves on the editorial boards of several artificial intelligence and robotics journals, on the board of directors of the Robotics: Science and Systems Foundation, on the advisory boards of the Journal of Artificial Intelligence Research and Americas School on Agents and Multiagent Systems, and on the steering committees of the International Conference on Automated Planning and Scheduling and the Symposium on Abstraction, Reformulation, and Approximation.

== Honors and awards ==
Koenig is the recipient of an ACM Recognition of Service Award, an NSF CAREER award, an IBM Faculty Partnership Award, a Charles Lee Powell Foundation Award, a Raytheon Faculty Fellowship Award, a Mellon Mentoring Award, a Fulbright Fellowship, the IEEE Computer Science and Engineering Undergraduate Teaching Award, and the Tong Leong Lim Pre-Doctoral Prize from the University of California at Berkeley.

== Selected publications ==
- S. Koenig. Goal-Directed Acting with Incomplete Information. PhD thesis, School of Computer Science, Carnegie Mellon University, Pittsburgh (Pennsylvania), 1997.
- R. Simmons and S. Koenig. Probabilistic Robot Navigation in Partially Observable Environments. In Proceedings of the International Joint Conference on Artificial Intelligence, 1080–1087, 1995.
- S. Koenig. Agent-Centered Search. Artificial Intelligence Magazine, 22, (4), 109-131, 2001.
- S. Koenig, M. Likhachev and D. Furcy. Lifelong Planning A*. Artificial Intelligence, 155, (1-2), 93-146, 2004.
- S. Koenig, M. Likhachev, Y. Liu and D. Furcy. Incremental Heuristic Search in Artificial Intelligence. Artificial Intelligence Magazine, 25, (2), 99-112, 2004.
- J. Svennebring and S. Koenig. Building Terrain-Covering Ant Robots. Autonomous Robots, 16, (3), 313-332, 2004.
- S. Koenig and M. Likhachev. Fast Replanning for Navigation in Unknown Terrain. Transactions on Robotics, 21, (3), 354-363, 2005.
- M. Lagoudakis, V. Markakis, D. Kempe, P. Keskinocak, S. Koenig, A. Kleywegt, C. Tovey, A. Meyerson and S. Jain. Auction-Based Multi-Robot Routing. In Proceedings of the International Conference on Robotics: Science and Systems, 343-350, 2005.
- Y. Liu and S. Koenig. Functional Value Iteration for Decision-Theoretic Planning with General Utility Functions. In Proceedings of the AAAI Conference on Artificial Intelligence (AAAI), 1186–1193, 2006.
