= Superflip =

Rubik's Cube configuration

computer graphic of the superflip pattern

The superflip or 12-flip is a special configuration on a Rubik's Cube, in which all the edge and corner pieces are in the correct permutation, and the eight corners are correctly oriented, but all twelve edges are oriented incorrectly ("flipped").

The term superflip is also used to refer to any algorithm that transforms the Rubik's Cube from its solved state into the superflip configuration.

== Properties ==
The superflip is a completely symmetrical combination, which means applying a superflip algorithm to the cube will always yield the same position, irrespective of the orientation in which the cube is held. There are only 3 other such combinations.

The superflip is self-inverse; i.e. performing a superflip algorithm twice will bring the cube back to the starting position.

Furthermore, the superflip is the only nontrivial central configuration of the Rubik's Cube. This means that it is commutative with all other algorithms – i.e. performing any algorithm X followed by a superflip algorithm yields exactly the same position as performing the superflip algorithm first followed by X – and it is the only configuration (except trivially for the solved state) with this property. By extension, this implies that a commutator of a superflip and any other algorithm will always bring the cube back to its solved position.

If the moves of the superflip algorithm are cycled, for example A B C → B C A, the algorithm will still result in the same combination. This does not apply to slice turn metric, because it also changes orientation of the cube.

== Algorithms ==
The table below shows four possible algorithms that transform a solved Rubik's Cube into its superflip configuration, together with the number of moves each algorithm has under each metric:

- the most commonly used half-turn metric (HTM), in which rotating a face (or outer layer) either 90° or 180° counts as a single move, but a "slice-turn" – i.e. rotating a centre layer – counts as two separate moves (equivalent to rotating the two outer layers in the opposite direction);
- the quarter-turn metric (QTM), in which only 90° face-turns count as single moves; thus, a 180° turn counts as two separate moves, while a slice-turn counts as either two or four moves (depending on whether the slice is moved 90° or 180°);
- the slice-turn metric (STM), in which 90° face-turns, 180° face-turns, and slice-turns (both 90° and 180° centre-layer rotations) all count as single moves.

All the algorithms below are recorded in Singmaster notation:

Algorithm	Number of turns under:		
Algorithm	HTM	QTM	STM
$\text{U R2 F B R B2 R U2 L B2 R U' D' R2 F R' L B2 U2 F2}$	20	28	19
$\text{R' U2 B L' F U' B D F U D' L D2 F' R B' D F' U' B' U D'}$	22	24	22
$\text{M2 U' R2 D' S M2 U M' U2 F2 D' S M2 U' R2 U'}$	22	32	16
$\text{M' U M' U M' U M' U y' z' M' U M' U M' U M' U y' z' M' U M' U M' U M' U}$	36	36	24

It has been shown that the shortest path between a solved cube and the superflip requires 20 moves under HTM (the first algorithm is one such example), and that no position requires more moves. The superflip is not unique in this regard, as there are many other positions that also require 20 moves.

Under the more restrictive QTM, the superflip requires at least 24 moves (the second algorithm above is one such sequence), and is not maximally distant from the solved state. Instead, when superflip is composed with the "four-dot" or "four-spot" position, in which four faces have their centres exchanged with the centres on the opposite face, the resulting position requires 26 moves under QTM.

Under STM, the superflip requires at least 16 moves (as shown by the third algorithm).

The last solution in the table is not optimal under any metric, but is both easiest to learn and fastest to do for humans, as the sequence of moves is very repetitive.

== See also ==
- God's algorithm
