= Rubik's Domino =

Mechanical puzzle

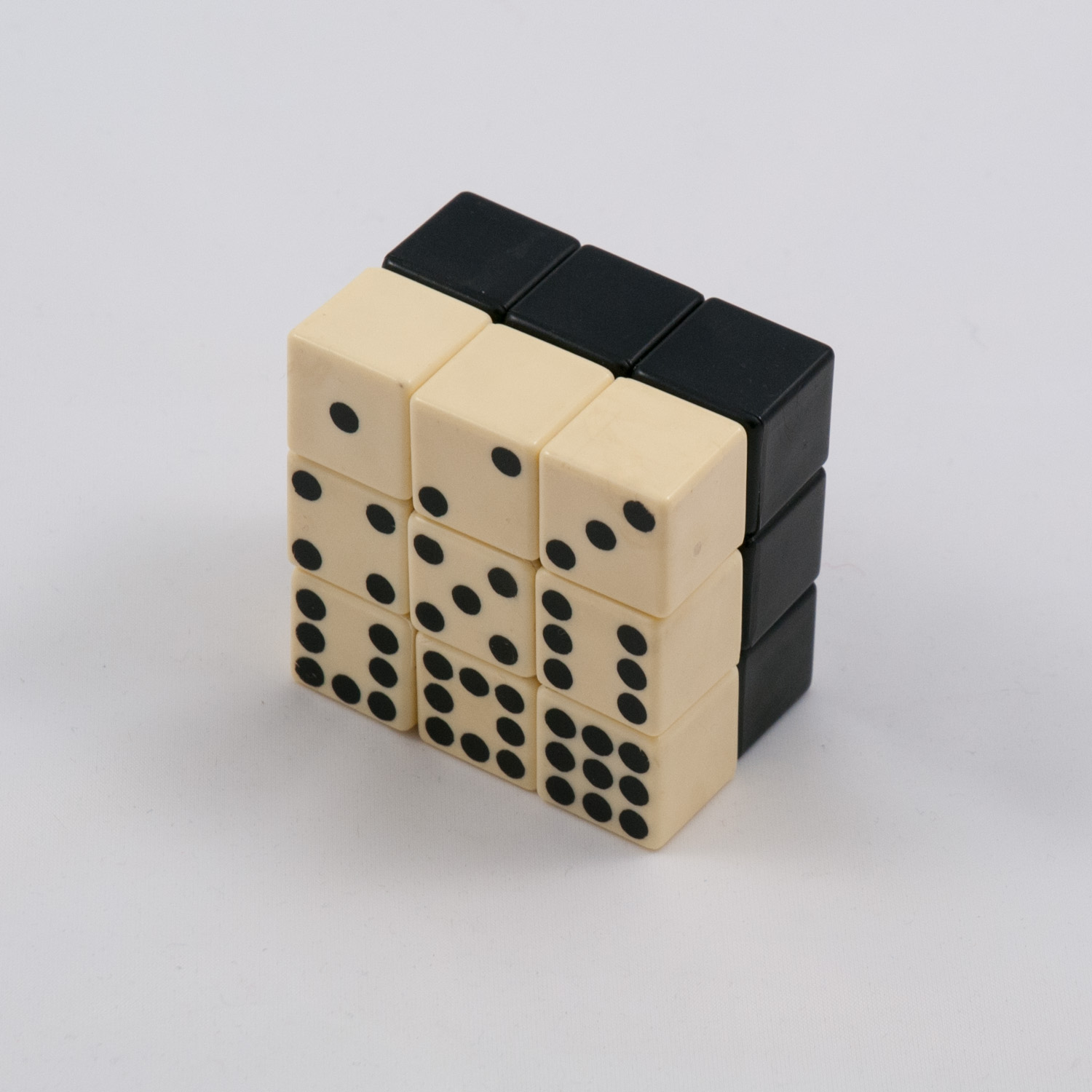
Rubik's Domino

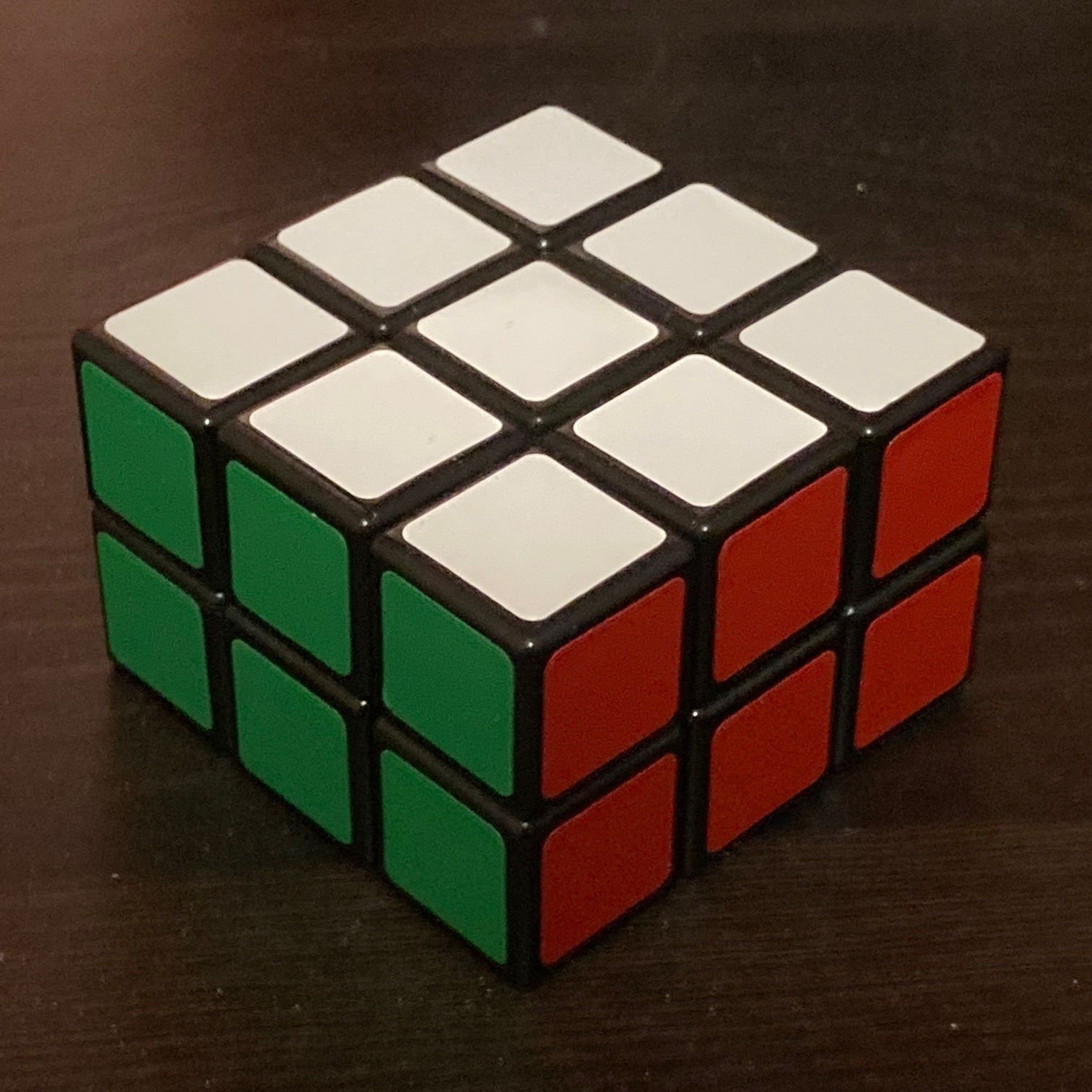
Rubik's Domino with coloured stickers

Rubik's Domino is a hand-held puzzle similar to a Rubik's Cube. However, it has one layer removed, making it a 2×3×3 cuboid. The 3×3 faces can be turned 90-degrees as normal, but the 2×3 faces can only be turned 180 degrees. Other cuboids of 2×2×n (if n is an even number) will solve like multiple dominoes at once. When only using pairs of turns, the puzzle may be solved similarly to a 3x3. The original version had white and black plastic layers. Each 3×3 face displayed a number of dots from 1–9. More recent versions use the traditional six-colour scheme, as seen on most other twisty puzzles. It has 406,425,600 potential positions and any position can be made into a solved position in 19 moves. It was registered as US Patent number 4378116 on 29 March 1983 by Ernő Rubik.
