= Matheuristics =

Mathematically programmed metaheuristics

Matheuristics are problem-agnostic optimization algorithms that make use of mathematical programming (MP) techniques in order to obtain heuristic solutions. Problem-dependent elements are included only within the lower-level mathematic programming, local search or constructive components. An essential feature is the exploitation in some part of the algorithms of features derived from the mathematical model of the problems of interest, thus the definition "model-based heuristics" appearing in the title of some events of the conference series dedicated to matheuristics matheuristics web page.

The topic has attracted the interest of a community of researchers, and this led to the publication of dedicated volumes and journal special issues besides to dedicated tracks and sessions on wider scope conferences.

A word of caution is needed before delving into the subject, because obviously the use of MP for solving optimization problems, albeit in a heuristic way, is much older and much more widespread than matheuristics. However, this is not the case for metaheuristics. Even the very idea of designing MP methods specifically for heuristic solution has innovative traits, when opposed to exact methods which turn into heuristics when enough computational resources are not available.

Some approaches using MP combined with metaheuristics have begun to appear regularly in the matheuristics literature. This combination can go two-ways, both in MP used to improve or design metaheuristics and in metaheuristics used for improving known MP techniques, even though the first of these two directions is by far more studied.

== Selected publications ==
- Maniezzo, Vittorio, Boschetti, Marco Antonio, Stützle, Thomas: Matheuristics, Algorithms and Implementations. Springer International Publishing (2021)
- M. Caserta, S. Voß: A math-heuristic algorithm for the DNA sequencing problem. Lecture Notes in Computer Science 6073 (2010), 25 - 36
- Boschetti, Marco Antonio, Maniezzo, Vittorio: Matheuristics: using mathematics for heuristic design. 4OR 20(2), 173–208, 2022
