= Richard E. Korf =

American computer scientist

Richard Earl Korf is an American computer scientist whose research in artificial intelligence has focused on heuristic search methods, including the invention of iterative deepening depth-first search and iterative deepening A*, often using puzzles as test cases for his algorithms. In 1997, he wrote the first computer program that could optimally solve the Rubik's Cube puzzle. He is a professor emeritus of computer science at the University of California, Los Angeles (UCLA).

== Education and career ==
Korf majored in electrical engineering and computer science at the Massachusetts Institute of Technology, working there with Gerald Jay Sussman and graduating in 1977. He continued his studies in computer science at Carnegie Mellon University, received a master's degree there in 1980, and completed his Ph.D. in 1983. His dissertation, Learning to Solve Problems by Searching for Macro-Operators, was supervised by Herbert A. Simon.

He became Herbert M. Singer Assistant Professor of Computer Science at Columbia University in 1983, then moved to UCLA in 1985. There, he was promoted to associate professor in 1988 and full professor in 1995.

== Recognition ==
Korf was elected as a Fellow of the Association for the Advancement of Artificial Intelligence in 1994, "for contributions to the development and analysis of heuristic search methods".

Korf's 1990 paper "Real-time heuristic search" was recognized as the 2016 Artificial Intelligence journal classic paper award winner.
