= Heuristic (computer science) =

Type of algorithm, produces approximately correct solutions

In mathematical optimization and computer science, heuristic (from Greek εὑρίσκω eurísko "I find, discover") is a technique designed for problem solving more quickly when classic methods are too slow for finding an exact or approximate solution, or when classic methods fail to find any exact solution in a search space. This is achieved by trading optimality, completeness, accuracy, or precision for speed. In a way, it can be considered a shortcut.

A heuristic function, also simply called a heuristic, is a function that ranks alternatives in search algorithms at each branching step based on available information to decide which branch to follow. For example, it may approximate the exact solution.

== Definition and motivation ==
The objective of a heuristic is to produce a solution in a reasonable time frame that is good enough for solving the problem at hand. This solution may not be the best of all the solutions to this problem, or it may simply approximate the exact solution. But it is still valuable because finding it does not require a prohibitively long time.

Heuristics may produce results by themselves, or they may be used in conjunction with optimization algorithms to improve their efficiency (e.g., they may be used to generate good seed values).

Results about NP-hardness in theoretical computer science make heuristics the only viable option for a variety of complex optimization problems that need to be routinely solved in real-world applications.

Heuristics underlie the whole field of artificial intelligence and the computer simulation of thinking, as they may be used in situations where there are no known algorithms.

== Examples ==
=== Simpler problem ===
One way of achieving the computational performance gain expected of a heuristic consists of solving a simpler problem whose solution is also a solution to the initial problem.

=== Travelling salesman problem ===
An example of approximation is described by Jon Bentley for solving the travelling salesman problem (TSP):

- "Given a list of cities and the distances between each pair of cities, what is the shortest possible route that visits each city exactly once and returns to the origin city?"

so as to select the order to draw using a pen plotter. TSP is known to be NP-hard so an optimal solution for even a moderate size problem is difficult to solve. Instead, the greedy algorithm can be used to give a good but not optimal solution (it is an approximation to the optimal answer) in a reasonably short amount of time. The greedy algorithm heuristic says to pick whatever is currently the best next step regardless of whether that prevents (or even makes impossible) good steps later. It is a heuristic in the sense that practice indicates it is a good enough solution, while theory indicates that there are better solutions (and even indicates how much better, in some cases).

=== Search ===
Another example of heuristic making an algorithm faster occurs in certain search problems. Initially, the heuristic tries every possibility at each step, like the full-space search algorithm. But it can stop the search at any time if the current possibility is already worse than the best solution already found. In such search problems, a heuristic can be used to try good choices first so that bad paths can be eliminated early (see alpha–beta pruning). In the case of best-first search algorithms, such as A* search, the heuristic improves the algorithm's convergence while maintaining its correctness as long as the heuristic is admissible.

=== Newell and Simon: heuristic search hypothesis ===
In their Turing Award acceptance speech, Allen Newell and Herbert A. Simon discuss the heuristic search hypothesis: a physical symbol system will repeatedly generate and modify known symbol structures until the created structure matches the solution structure. Each following step depends upon the step before it, thus the heuristic search learns what avenues to pursue and which ones to disregard by measuring how close the current step is to the solution. Therefore, some possibilities will never be generated as they are measured to be less likely to complete the solution.

A heuristic method can accomplish its task by using search trees. However, instead of generating all possible solution branches, a heuristic selects branches more likely to produce outcomes than other branches. It is selective at each decision point, picking branches that are more likely to produce solutions.

=== Common Heuristic Algorithms in AI ===
Heuristics are central to many informed search algorithms and optimization techniques for AI:

- A* Search Algorithm The A* search algorithm is one of the most popular heuristic search techniques due to its ability to find optimal solutions efficiently. A* combines both the actual path cost and the heuristic estimate of the remaining cost to reach the goal.
- Greedy Best-First Search: This algorithm expands the node that is closest to the goal based solely on the heuristic function (h(n)), without considering the path cost so far. It is fast but does not guarantee an optimal solution.
- Hill Climbing: A local search algorithm that iteratively moves from the current state to a better neighboring state. It is simple to implement but can get stuck in local optima (suboptimal solutions that are better than their immediate neighbors but not the overall best). An objective function (like a gradient for continuous spaces) to determine direction.
- Simulated Annealing: Simulated Annealing is a heuristic search technique that explores the search space by occasionally accepting worse solutions to avoid getting stuck in local maxima. Inspired by the annealing process in metallurgy, this algorithm gradually reduces the probability of accepting worse solutions as the search progresses. By allowing exploration of suboptimal solutions, simulated annealing can escape local maxima and find a better overall solution. It is commonly used in optimization problems where the search space is large and complex.
- Genetic Algorithms: These are inspired by natural selection, using processes like selection, crossover, and mutation to evolve a population of candidate solutions over generations.
- Ant Colony Optimization: A swarm intelligence method inspired by the way ants find paths to food sources, using artificial "pheromones" to guide the search.

=== Antivirus software ===
Antivirus software often uses heuristic rules for detecting viruses and other forms of malware. Heuristic scanning looks for code and/or behavioral patterns common to a class or family of viruses, with different sets of rules for different viruses. If a file or executing process is found to contain matching code patterns and/or to be performing that set of activities, then the scanner infers that the file is infected. The most advanced part of behavior-based heuristic scanning is that it can work against highly randomized self-modifying/mutating (polymorphic) viruses that cannot be easily detected by simpler string scanning methods. Heuristic scanning has the potential to detect future viruses without requiring the virus to be first detected somewhere else, submitted to the virus scanner developer, analyzed, and a detection update for the scanner provided to the scanner's users.

== Pitfalls ==
Some heuristics have a strong underlying theory; they are either derived in a top-down manner from the theory or are arrived at based on either experimental or real world data. Others are just rules of thumb based on real-world observation or experience without even a glimpse of theory. The latter are exposed to a larger number of pitfalls.

When a heuristic is reused in various contexts because it has been seen to "work" in one context, without having been mathematically proven to meet a given set of requirements, it is possible that the current data set does not necessarily represent future data sets (see: overfitting) and that purported "solutions" turn out to be akin to noise.

Statistical analysis can be conducted when employing heuristics to estimate the probability of incorrect outcomes. To use a heuristic for solving a search problem or a knapsack problem, it is necessary to check that the heuristic is admissible. Given a heuristic function $h(v_i, v_g)$ meant to approximate the true optimal distance $d^\star(v_i,v_g)$ to the goal node $v_g$ in a directed graph $G$ containing $n$ total nodes or vertices labeled $v_0,v_1,\cdots,v_n$, "admissible" means roughly that the heuristic underestimates the cost to the goal or formally that $h(v_i, v_g) \leq d^\star(v_i,v_g)$ for all $(v_i, v_g)$ where ${i,g} \in [0, 1, ... , n]$.

If a heuristic is not admissible, it may never find the goal, either by ending up in a dead end of graph $G$ or by skipping back and forth between two nodes $v_i$ and $v_j$ where ${i, j}\neq g$.

== Etymology ==
The word "heuristic" came into usage in the early 19th century. It is formed irregularly from the Greek word heuriskein, meaning "to find".

== See also ==
- Constructive heuristic
- Metaheuristic: Methods for controlling and tuning basic heuristic algorithms, usually with usage of memory and learning.
- Matheuristics: Optimization algorithms made by the interoperation of metaheuristics and mathematical programming (MP) techniques.
- Reactive search optimization: Methods using online machine learning principles for self-tuning of heuristics.
