= Farthest neighbor =

Farthest neighbor may refer to:

- Farthest neighbor graph in geometry
- The farthest neighbor method for calculating distances between clusters in hierarchical clustering.

== See also ==
- Nearest neighbor (disambiguation)
