= False nearest neighbor algorithm =

Within dynamical systems, the false nearest neighbor algorithm is an algorithm for estimating the embedding dimension. The concept was proposed by Kennel et al. (1992). The main idea is to examine how the number of neighbors of a point along a signal trajectory change with increasing embedding dimension. In too low an embedding dimension, many of the neighbors will be false, but in an appropriate embedding dimension or higher, the neighbors are real. With increasing dimension, the false neighbors will no longer be neighbors. Therefore, by examining how the number of neighbors change as a function of dimension, an appropriate embedding can be determined.

== See also ==
- Commutative ring
- Local ring
- Nearest neighbor
- Time series
