= Isosceles set =

The unique 6-point isosceles set in the plane. The shaded regions show four of the 20 isosceles triangles formed by triples of these points.

In discrete geometry, an isosceles set is a set of points with the property that every three of them form an isosceles triangle. More precisely, each three points should determine at most two distances; this also allows degenerate isosceles triangles formed by three equally-spaced points on a line.

== History ==
The problem of finding the largest isosceles set in a Euclidean space of a given dimension was posed in 1946 by Paul Erdős. In his statement of the problem, Erdős observed that the largest such set in the Euclidean plane has six points. In his 1947 solution, Leroy Milton Kelly showed more strongly that the unique six-point planar isosceles set consists of the vertices and center of a regular pentagon. In three dimensions, Kelly found an eight-point isosceles set, six points of which are the same; the remaining two points lie on a line perpendicular to the pentagon through its center, at the same distance as the pentagon vertices from the center. This three-dimensional example was later proven to be optimal, and to be the unique optimal solution.

== Decomposition into 2-distance sets ==
Kelly's eight-point three-dimensional isosceles set can be decomposed into two sets $X$ (the three points on a line perpendicular to the pentagon) and $Y$ (the five vertices of the pentagon), with the property that each point in $X$ is equidistant from all points of $Y$. When such a decomposition is possible, in Euclidean spaces of any dimension, $X$ and $Y$ must lie in perpendicular subspaces, $X$ must be an isosceles set within its subspace, and the set $Y'$ formed from $Y$ by adding the point at the intersection of its two subspaces must also be an isosceles set within its subspace. In this way, an isosceles set in high dimensions can sometimes be decomposed into isosceles sets in lower dimensions. On the other hand, when an isosceles set has no decomposition of this type, then it must have a stronger property than being isosceles: it has only two distances, among all pairs of points.

Despite this decomposition theorem, it is possible for the largest two-distance set and the largest isosceles set in the same dimension to have different sizes. This happens, for instance, in the plane, where the largest two-distance set has five points (the vertices of a regular pentagon), while the largest isosceles set has six points. In this case, the six-point isosceles set has a decomposition where $X$ is the singleton set of the central point (in a space of zero dimensions) and $Y$ consists of all remaining points.

== Upper bounds ==
In $d$-dimensional space, an isosceles set can have at most
$$\binom{d+2}{2}$$
points. This is tight for $d=6$ and for $d=8$ but not necessarily for other dimensions. The maximum number of points in a $d$-dimensional isosceles set, for $d=1,2,\dots, 8$, is known to be

3, 6, 8, 11, 17, 28, 30, 45 (sequence A175769 in the OEIS)

but these numbers are not known for higher dimensions.

== Construction ==
Lisoněk provides the following construction of two-distance sets with
$$\binom{d+1}{2}$$
points, which also produces isosceles sets with
$$\binom{d+1}{2}+1$$
points. In $d+1$-dimensional Euclidean space, let $e_i$ (for $i=1,\dots,d+1$) denote the vector a unit distance from the origin along the $i$th coordinate axis, and construct the set $S$ consisting of all points $e_i+e_j$ for $i\ne j$. Then $S$ lies in the $d$-dimensional subspace of points with coordinate sum $2$; its convex hull is the hypersimplex $\Delta_{d+1,2}$. It has only two distances: two points formed from sums of overlapping pairs of unit vectors have distance $\sqrt2$, while two points formed from disjoint pairs of unit vectors have distance $2$. Adding one more point to $S$ at its centroid forms a $d$-dimensional isosceles set. For instance, for $d=3$, this construction produces a suboptimal isosceles set with seven points, the vertices and center of a regular octahedron, rather than the optimal eight-point set.

== Generalization ==
The same problem can also be considered for other metric spaces. For instance, for Hamming spaces, somewhat smaller upper bounds are known than for Euclidean spaces of the same dimension. In an ultrametric space, the whole space (and any of its subsets) is an isosceles set. Therefore, ultrametric spaces are sometimes called isosceles spaces. However, not every isosceles set is ultrametric; for instance, obtuse Euclidean isosceles triangles are not ultrametric.
