= Maklamicin =

Names
- IUPAC name (1S,3R,6R,8E,10R,11S,14S,16S,19R,20S)-21-hydroxy-4-(hydroxymethyl)-3-[(2R)-2-hydroxypropyl]-6,10,16,20-tetramethyl-24-oxapentacyclo[20.2.1.0^{1,6}.0^{11,20}.0^{14,19}]pentacosa-4,8,12,21-tetraene-23,25-dione

Identifiers
3D model (JSmol)	Interactive image
ChEBI	CHEBI:67872
ChemSpider	65323138
PubChem CID	101796870
- InChI: InChI=1S/C32H44O6/c1-18-8-10-25-21(13-18)9-11-24-19(2)7-6-12-30(4)15-23(17-33)22(14-20(3)34)16-32(30)28(36)26(29(37)38-32)27(35)31(24,25)5/h6-7,9,11,15,18-22,24-25,33-35H,8,10,12-14,16-17H2,1-5H3/b7-6+,27-26?/t18-,19+,20+,21+,22+,24-,25+,30+,31+,32+/m0/s1 Key: VJLSELMYIYSGPA-UBMJFAPJSA-N
- SMILES: C[C@@H]1C[C@@H]2[C@H]([C@@](C(C3=C(O)[C@@]45OC3=O)=O)(C)[C@H]([C@H](C)/C=C/C[C@]4(C)C=C(CO)[C@H](C[C@@H](C)O)C5)C=C2)CC1

Properties
Chemical formula	C_{32}H_{44}O_{6}
Molar mass	524.698 g·mol^{−1}
- Except where otherwise noted, data are given for materials in their standard state (at 25 °C [77 °F], 100 kPa). Infobox references

Maklamicin is a spirotetronate-class polyketide natural product. Isolated from Micromonospora sp. GMKU326 found in the root of Maklam phueak, it displays antibiotic activity against Gram-positive bacterial strains Micrococcus luteus, Bacillus subtilis, Bacillius cereus, Staphylococcus aureus, and Enterococcus faecalis.

== Biosynthesis ==
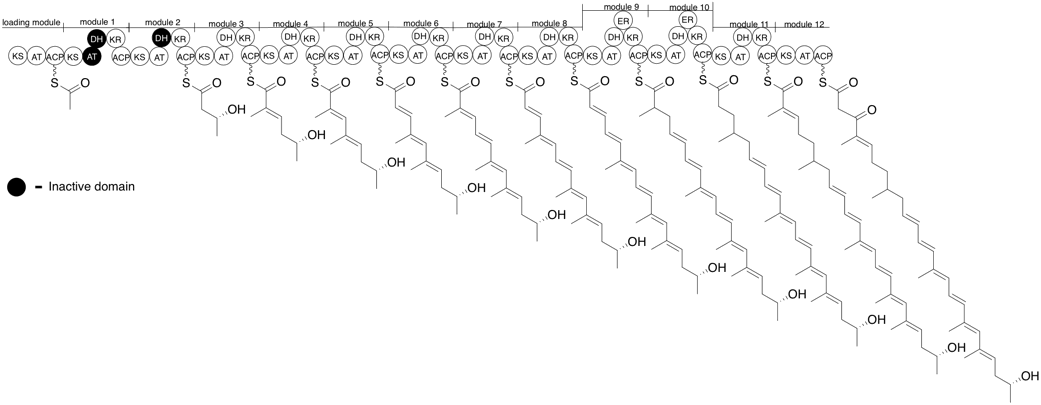
Polyketide chain extension on the maklamicin PKSs. The circles represent enzymatic domains in the PKS polypeptide: KS, ketosynthase; AT, aceyltransferase; DH, dehydratase; ER, enoylreductase; KR, ketoreductase; ACP, acyl carrier protein. The presumed inactive AT and DH domains of module 1 and module 2 are shaded in black.

Maklamicin arises from a type I modular polyketide synthase (PKS) system. The structure of its polyketide chain extension has been shown to contain thirteen discrete PKS modules (a loading module and twelve extension modules).

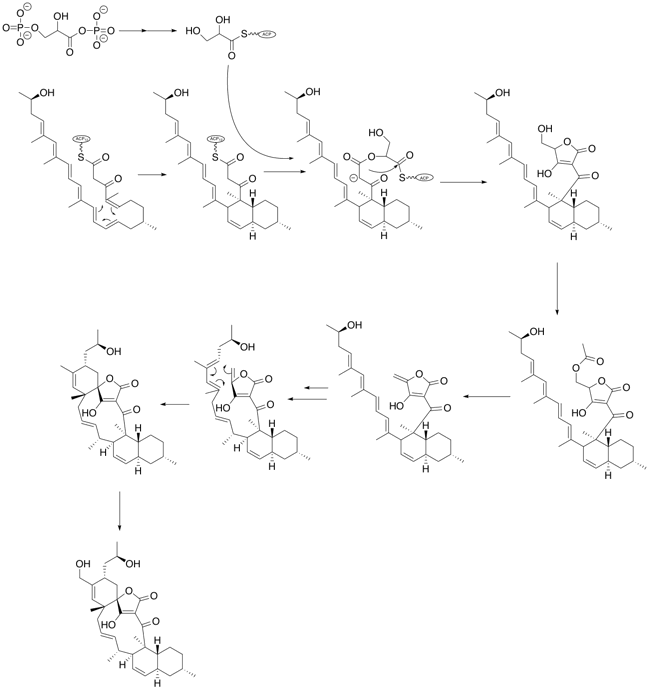
Proposed pathway for maklamicin biosynthesis in the Micormonospora sp.

After passing through the extension domains the linear polyketide precursor to Maklamicin undergoes an intramolecular Diels-Alder reaction (IMDA) to form its trans-decalin motif. 1,3-bisphosphoglycerate is converted to glyceryl S-ACP and condenses onto the decalin-bearing polyketide intermediate to furnish an intermediate containing the premature tetronate moiety. This intermediate then acetylated and subsequently dehydrated to form the exocyclic olefin of the mature tetronate moiety. The intermediate, now containing both the tetronate and trans-decalin motifs of Maklamicin is then systematically reduced to afford a diene. A second IMDA then occurs between the tetronate and newly formed dienophile to yield the ultimate intermediate which is oxidized to afford Maklamicin.
