= Nearest neighbor =

Nearest neighbor may refer to:

- Nearest neighbor search in pattern recognition and in computational geometry
- Nearest-neighbor interpolation for interpolating data
- Nearest neighbor graph in geometry
- Nearest neighbor function in probability theory
- Nearest neighbor decoding in coding theory
- The k-nearest neighbor algorithm in machine learning, an application of generalized forms of nearest neighbor search and interpolation
- The nearest neighbour algorithm for approximately solving the travelling salesman problem
- The nearest-neighbor thermodynamic parameters for determining the thermodynamics of nucleic acids
- The nearest neighbor clustering for calculating distances between clusters in hierarchical clustering

== See also ==
- Moore neighborhood
- Von Neumann neighborhood
