= Ultrametric space =

Type of metric space

In mathematics, an ultrametric space is a metric space in which the triangle inequality is strengthened to $d(x,z)\leq\max\left\{d(x,y),d(y,z)\right\}$ for all $x$, $y$, and $z$. Sometimes the associated metric is also called a non-Archimedean metric or super-metric.

== Formal definition ==
An ultrametric on a set $M$ is a real-valued function

$$d\colon M \times M \rightarrow \mathbb{R}$$

(where $\mathbb{R}$ denotes the real numbers), such that for all $x,y,z\in M$:

1. $d(x,y)\geq0$ with equality if and only if $x=y$ (non-degeneracy)
2. $d(x,y)=d(y,x)$ (symmetry)
3. $d(x,z)\leq\max\{d(x,y),d(y,z)\}$ (strong triangle inequality or ultrametric inequality).

An ultrametric space is a pair $(M,d)$ consisting of a set $M$ together with an ultrametric $d$ on $M$, which is called the space's associated distance function (also called a metric).

If $d$ satisfies all of the conditions but the "if and only if" in condition 1 is weakened to "if", then $d$ is called an ultrapseudometric on $M$. An ultrapseudometric space is a pair $(M,d)$ consisting of a set $M$ and an ultrapseudometric $d$ on $M$.

In the case when $M$ is an Abelian group (written additively) and $d$ is generated by a length function $\|\cdot\|$ (so that $d(x,y) = \|x - y\|$), the last property can be made stronger using the Krull sharpening to:

$\|x+y\|\le \max \left\{ \|x\|, \|y\| \right\}$ with equality if $\|x\| \ne \|y\|$.

We want to prove that if $\|x+y\| \le \max \left\{ \|x\|, \|y\|\right\}$, then the equality occurs if $\|x\| \ne \|y\|$. Without loss of generality, let us assume that $\|x\| > \|y\|.$ This implies that $\|x + y\| \le \|x\|$. But we can also compute $\|x\|=\|(x+y)-y\| \le \max \left\{ \|x+y\|, \|y\|\right\}$. Now, the value of $\max \left\{ \|x+y\|, \|y\|\right\}$ cannot be $\|y\|$, for if that is the case, we have $\|x\| \le \|y\|$ contrary to the initial assumption. Thus, $\max \left\{ \|x+y\|, \|y\|\right\}=\|x+y\|$, and $\|x\| \le \|x+y\|$. Using the initial inequality, we have $\|x\| \le \|x + y\| \le \|x\|$ and therefore $\|x+y\| = \|x\|$.

== Properties ==
In the triangle on the right, the two bottom points x and y violate the condition d(x, y) ≤ max{d(x, z), d(y, z)}.

From the above definition, one can conclude several typical properties of ultrametrics. For example, for all $x,y,z \in M$, at least one of the three equalities $d(x,y) = d(y,z)$ or $d(x,z) = d(y,z)$ or $d(x,y) = d(z,x)$ holds. That is, every triple of points in the space forms an isosceles triangle, so the whole space is an isosceles set.

Defining the (open) ball of radius $r > 0$ centred at $x \in M$ as $B(x;r) := \{y \in M \mid d(x,y) < r\}$, we have the following properties:

- Every point inside a ball is one of its centers, i.e. if $d(x,y)<r$ then $B(x;r)=B(y;r)$.
- Intersecting balls are contained in each other, i.e. if $B(x;r)\cap B(y;s)$ is non-empty then either $B(x;r) \subseteq B(y;s)$ or $B(y;s) \subseteq B(x;r)$.
- All balls of strictly positive radius are both open and closed sets in the induced topology. That is, open balls are also closed, and closed balls (replace $<$ with $\leq$) are also open.
- The set of all open balls with radius $r$ and center in a closed ball of radius $r>0$ forms a partition of the latter, and the mutual distance of two distinct open balls is (greater or) equal to $r$.

Proving these statements is an instructive exercise. All directly derive from the ultrametric triangle inequality. Note that, by the second statement, a ball may have several center points that have non-zero distance. The intuition behind such seemingly strange effects is that, due to the strong triangle inequality, distances in ultrametrics do not add up.

== Examples ==
- The discrete metric is an ultrametric.
- The p-adic numbers form a complete ultrametric space.
- Consider the set of words of arbitrary length (finite or infinite),$\Sigma^*$, over some alphabet $\Sigma$. Define the distance between two different words to be $2^{-n}$, where $n$ is the first place at which the words differ. The resulting metric is an ultrametric.
- The set of words with glued ends of the length $n$ over some alphabet $\Sigma$ is an ultrametric space with respect to the p-close distance. Two words $x$ and $y$ are p-close if any substring of p consecutive letters ( $p < n$) appears the same number of times (which could also be zero) both in $x$ and $y$.
- If $r = (r_n)$ is a sequence of real numbers decreasing to zero, then $|x|_r := \limsup_{n\rightarrow\infty} |x_n|^{r_n}$ induces an ultrametric on the space of all complex sequences for which it is finite. (Note that this is not a seminorm since it lacks homogeneity — If the $r_n$ are allowed to be zero, one should use here the rather unusual convention that $0^0=0$ (Zero to the power of zero).
- If $G$ is an edge-weighted undirected graph, all edge weights are positive, and $d(u,v)$ is the weight of the minimax path between $u$ and $v$ (that is, the largest weight of an edge, on a path chosen to minimize this largest weight), then the vertices of the graph, with distance measured by $d$, form an ultrametric space, and all finite ultrametric spaces may be represented in this way.

== Applications ==
- A contraction mapping may then be thought of as a way of approximating the final result of a computation (which can be guaranteed to exist by the Banach fixed-point theorem). Similar ideas can be found in domain theory. p-adic analysis makes heavy use of the ultrametric nature of the p-adic metric.
- In condensed matter physics, the self-averaging overlap between spins in the SK Model of spin glasses exhibits an ultrametric structure, with the solution given by the full replica symmetry breaking procedure first outlined by Giorgio Parisi and coworkers. Ultrametricity also appears in the theory of aperiodic solids.
- In taxonomy and phylogenetic tree construction, ultrametric distances are also utilized by the UPGMA and WPGMA methods. These algorithms require a constant-rate assumption and produce trees in which the distances from the root to every branch tip are equal. When DNA, RNA and protein data are analyzed, the ultrametricity assumption is called the molecular clock.
- Models of intermittency in three dimensional turbulence of fluids make use of so-called cascades, and in discrete models of dyadic cascades, which have an ultrametric structure.
- In geography and landscape ecology, ultrametric distances have been applied to measure landscape complexity and to assess the extent to which one landscape function is more important than another.
- In astronomy, dendrograms are examples of hierarchical trees used to analyze and classify data. The height at which two branches of two respective objects meet can be used to define the ultrametrics distance between the two objects. In other words, the higher up the two branches meet, the greater the distance between the objects.

== Bibliography ==
- Narici, Lawrence; Beckenstein, Edward (2011). Topological Vector Spaces. Pure and applied mathematics (Second ed.). Boca Raton, FL: CRC Press. ISBN 978-1584888666. OCLC 144216834.
- Schaefer, Helmut H.; Wolff, Manfred P. (1999). Topological Vector Spaces. GTM. Vol. 8 (Second ed.). New York, NY: Springer New York Imprint Springer. ISBN 978-1-4612-7155-0. OCLC 840278135.
