= Dendrogram =

Diagram with a treelike structure

Dendrogram of a hierarchical clustering (UPGMA) with the height of the nodes (adapted from bacterial 5S rRNA sequence data).

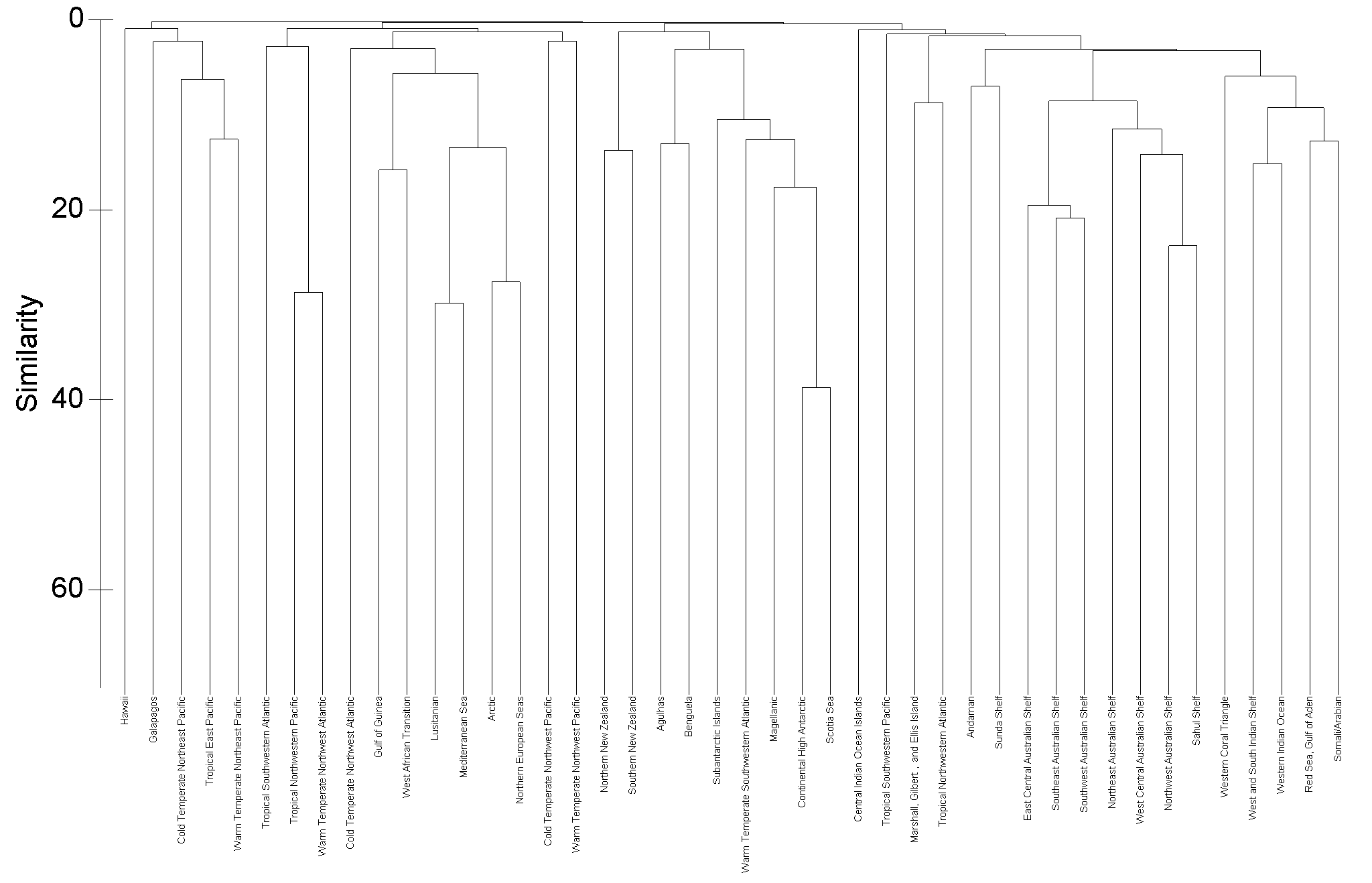
Dendrogram output for hierarchical clustering of marine provinces using presence / absence of sponge species.

A dendrogram of the Tree of Life. This phylogenetic tree is adapted from Woese et al. rRNA analysis. The vertical line at bottom represents the last universal common ancestor (LUCA).

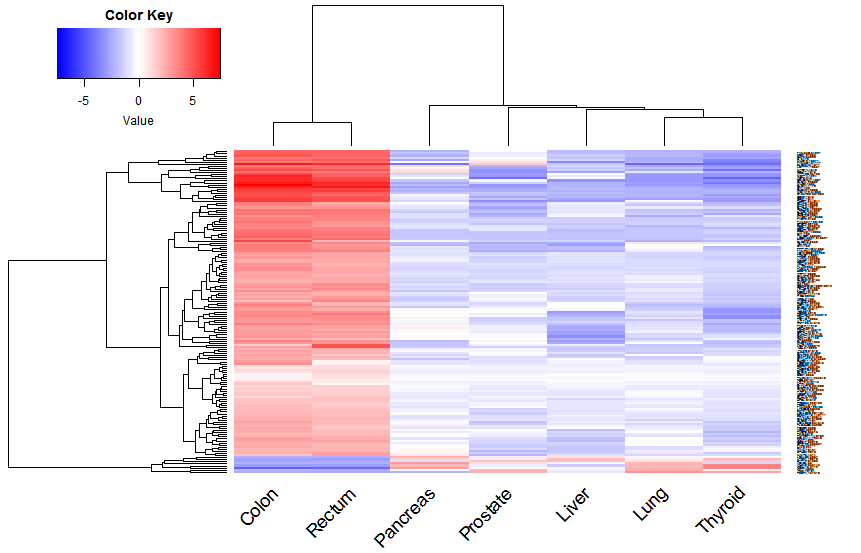
Heatmap of RNA-Seq data showing two dendrograms in the left and top margins.

A dendrogram is a diagram representing a tree graph. This diagrammatic representation is frequently used in different contexts:

- in hierarchical clustering, it illustrates the arrangement of the clusters produced by the corresponding analyses.
- in computational biology, it shows the clustering of genes or samples, sometimes in the margins of heatmaps.
- in phylogenetics, it displays the evolutionary relationships among various biological taxa. In this case, the dendrogram is also called a phylogenetic tree.

The name dendrogram derives from the two ancient greek words δένδρον (déndron), meaning "tree", and γράμμα (grámma), meaning "drawing, mathematical figure".

== Clustering example ==
For a clustering example, suppose that five taxa ($a$ to $e$) have been clustered by UPGMA based on a matrix of genetic distances. The hierarchical clustering dendrogram would show a column of five nodes representing the initial data (here individual taxa), and the remaining nodes represent the clusters to which the data belong, with the arrows representing the distance (dissimilarity). The distance between merged clusters is monotone, increasing with the level of the merger: the height of each node in the plot is proportional to the value of the intergroup dissimilarity between its two daughters (the nodes on the right representing individual observations all plotted at zero height).

== See also ==
- Cladogram
- Distance matrices in phylogeny
- Hierarchical clustering
- MEGA, a freeware for drawing dendrograms
- yEd, a freeware for drawing and automatically arranging dendrograms
- Taxonomy
