= Raymond's algorithm =

Raymond's Algorithm is a lock based algorithm for mutual exclusion on a distributed system. It imposes a logical structure (a K-ary tree) on distributed resources. As defined, each node has only a single parent, to which all requests to attain the token are made.

== Algorithm ==
=== Nodal properties ===
1. Each node has only one parent to whom received requests are forwarded
2. Each node maintains a FIFO queue of requests each time that it sees the token;
3. If any node is forwarding privilege to other node and has non-empty queue then it forwards a request message along

=== Algorithm ===
1. If a node i (not holding the token) wishes to receive the token in order to enter into its critical section, it sends a request to its parent, node j.
  - If node j FIFO is empty, node j shifts i into its FIFO queue; j then issues a request to its parent, k, that it desires the token
  - If node j FIFO queue is not empty, it simply shifts i into the queue
2. When node k has token and receives the request from j it sends token to j and sets j as its parent
3. When node j receives the token from k, it forwards the token to i and i is removed from the queue of j
  - If the queue of j is not empty after forwarding the token to i, j must issue a request to i in order to get the token back

Note: If j wishes to request a token, and its queue is not empty, then it places itself into its own queue. Node j will utilize the token to enter into its critical section if it is at the head of the queue when the token is received.

== Complexity ==
Raymond's algorithm is guaranteed to be O(log n) per critical section entry if the processors are organized into a K-ary tree. Additionally, each processor needs to store at most O(log n) bits because it must track O(1) neighbors.

== See also ==
- Ricart–Agrawala algorithm
- Lamport's bakery algorithm
- Lamport's distributed mutual exclusion algorithm
- Maekawa's algorithm
- Suzuki–Kasami algorithm
- Naimi–Trehel algorithm
