= Agrawala =

Agrawala is an Indian (Agrawal) surname. Notable people with this surname include:

- Ashok Agrawala, professor
- Maneesh Agrawala (born 1972), computer science professor
- Vasudeva Sharan Agrawala (1904–1966), Indian scholar
