= Maekawa's algorithm =

Maekawa's algorithm is an algorithm for mutual exclusion on a distributed system. The basis of this algorithm is a quorum-like approach where any one site needs only to seek permissions from a subset of other sites.

== Algorithm ==
=== Terminology ===
- A site is any computing device which runs the Maekawa's algorithm
- For any one request of entering the critical section:
  - The requesting site is the site which is requesting to enter the critical section.
  - The receiving site is every other site which is receiving the request from the requesting site.
- ts refers to the local time stamp of the system according to its logical clock

=== Algorithm ===
Requesting site:

- A requesting site $P_i$ sends a message $\text{request}(ts, i)$ to all sites in its quorum set $R_i$.

Receiving site:

- Upon reception of a $\text{request}(ts, i)$ message, the receiving site $P_j$ will:
  - If site $P_j$ does not have an outstanding $\text{grant}$ message (that is, a $\text{grant}$ message that has not been released), then site $P_j$ sends a $\text{grant}(j)$ message to site $P_i$.
  - If site $P_j$ has an outstanding $\text{grant}$ message with a process with higher priority than the request, then site $P_j$ sends a $\text{failed}(j)$ message to site $P_i$ and site $P_j$ queues the request from site $P_i$.
  - If site $P_j$ has an outstanding $\text{grant}$ message with a process with lower priority than the request, then site $P_j$ sends an $\text{inquire}(j)$ message to the process which has currently been granted access to the critical section by site $P_j$. (That is, the site with the outstanding $\text{grant}$ message.)
- Upon reception of a $\text{inquire}(j)$ message, the site $P_k$ will:
  - Send a $\text{yield}(k)$ message to site $P_j$ if and only if site $P_k$ has received a $\text{failed}$ message from some other site or if $P_k$ has sent a yield to some other site but have not received a new $\text{grant}$.
- Upon reception of a $\text{yield}(k)$ message, site $P_j$ will:
  - Send a $\text{grant}(j)$ message to the request on the top of its own request queue. Note that the requests at the top are the highest priority.
  - Place $P_k$ into its request queue.
- Upon reception of a $\text{release}(i)$ message, site $P_j$ will:
  - Delete $P_i$ from its request queue.
  - Send a $\text{grant}(j)$ message to the request on the top of its request queue.

Critical section:

- Site $P_i$ enters the critical section on receiving a $\text{grant}$ message from all sites in $R_i$.
- Upon exiting the critical section, $P_i$ sends a $\text{release}(i)$ message to all sites in $R_i$.

Quorum set ($R_x$):
A quorum set must abide by the following properties:

1. $\forall i \,\forall j\, [R_i \bigcap R_j \ne \empty ]$
2. $\forall i\, [ P_i \in R_i ]$
3. $\forall i\, [ |R_i| = K ]$
4. Site $P_i$ is contained in exactly $K$ request sets

Therefore: $|R_i| \geq \sqrt{N-1}$

=== Performance ===
- Number of network messages; $3 \sqrt{N}$ to $6 \sqrt{N}$
- Synchronization delay: 2 message propagation delays
- The algorithm can deadlock without protections in place.

== See also ==
- Lamport's bakery algorithm
- Lamport's Distributed Mutual Exclusion Algorithm
- Ricart–Agrawala algorithm
- Raymond's algorithm
