= Layered queueing network =

In queueing theory, a discipline within the mathematical theory of probability, a layered queueing network (or rendezvous network) is a queueing network model where the service time for each job at each service node is given by the response time of a queueing network (and those service times in turn may also be determined by further nested networks). Resources can be nested and queues form along the nodes of the nesting structure. The nesting structure thus defines "layers" within the queueing model.

Layered queueing has applications in a wide range of distributed systems which involve different master/slave, replicated services and client-server components, allowing each local node to be represented by a specific queue, then orchestrating the evaluation of these queues.

For large population of jobs, a fluid limit has been shown in PEPA to be a give good approximation of performance measures.
