= Maria Serna =

Spanish computer scientist

Maria José Serna Iglesias (born 1959) is a Spanish computer scientist and mathematician whose research includes work on parallel approximation, on algorithms for cutwidth and linear layout of graphs, on algorithmic game theory, and on adversarial queueing networks.

== Education ==
Serna earned two licenciates (undergraduate degrees), one in mathematics from the University of Barcelona in 1981 and a second in computer science from the Polytechnic University of Catalonia in 1985. After visiting the University of Patras in Greece to work with Paul Spirakis, with the support of the Spanish Ministry of Education, she completed in Ph.D. in 1990 through the Polytechnic University of Catalonia. Her dissertation, The Parallel Approximability of P-complete Problems, combined the ideas of parallel algorithms and approximation algorithms, and was jointly supervised by Spirakis and Joaquim Gabarró.

While in Patras, she continued to hold an associate professor position at the Polytechnic University of Catalonia, in the department of applied mathematics. On her return fram Patras, she was promoted to full professor in 1991, moved to the computer science department in 1992, and has been a university professor since 2006.

== Books ==
Serna is the coauthor of the book Paradigms for Fast Parallel Approximability (with Josep Díaz, Paul Spirakis, and Jacobo Torán, Cambridge University Press, 1997), and of several Spanish and Catalan-language textbooks.

== Recognition ==
In 2021, a special issue of the journal Computer Science Review was published as a festschrift in honor of Serna's 60th birthday.
