= FNN =

FNN may refer to:

- False nearest neighbor algorithm
- Farnborough North railway station, in England
- Feedforward neural network
- Financial News Network, a defunct American television network
- Flat neighborhood network, a type of computer network
- Fox News Network, U.S. cable news network
- Fuji News Network, a Japanese television network
- Fuzzy neural network
- Fake News Network, a mockery used for CNN primarily during and a while after the 2016 United States presidential election
