= Matrix clock =

A matrix clock is a mechanism for capturing chronological and causal relationships in a distributed system.

Matrix clocks are a generalization of the notion of vector clocks. A matrix clock maintains a vector of the vector clocks for each communicating host.

Every time a message is exchanged, the sending host sends not only what it knows about the global state of time, but also the state of time that it received from other hosts.

This allows establishing a lower bound on what other hosts know, and is useful in applications such as checkpointing and garbage collection.

== See also ==
- Lamport timestamps
- Vector clock
- Version vector
