= Moustafa Youssef =

Egyptian computer scientist (born 1975)

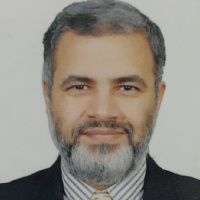
- Moustafa Youssef in 2018
- Born: 1975 (age 50–51); Alexandria, Egypt
- Citizenship: Egyptian
- Education: Alexandria University (B.Sc., M.Sc.); University of Maryland, College Park (M.Sc., Ph.D.)
- Known for: Location tracking algorithms and systems Ubiquitous indoor localization Sensor-less sensing Horus System
- Awards: ACM Fellow (2019); IEEE Fellow (2019); Egyptian State Excellence Award (2017); Common Market for Eastern and Southern Africa (COMESA) Innovation Award (2015); Common Market for Eastern and Southern Africa (COMESA) Innovation Award (2013); Egyptian State Award for Engineering Sciences (2012); TWAS-AAS-Microsoft Award (2010); Invention of the Year Award, University of Maryland (2004)
- Scientific career
- Fields: Localization; Wireless sensor networks; Pervasive computing; Machine Learning
- Workplaces: American University in Cairo; Alexandria University; Egypt-Japan University of Science and Technology; Nile University; University of Maryland, College Park
- Thesis: Horus: A WLAN-based Indoor Location Determination System (2004)
- Doctoral advisor: Ashok Agrawala

Moustafa Youssef (Arabic: مصطفى يوسف) is an Egyptian-American computer scientist who was named an IEEE Fellow in 2019 for contributions to wireless location tracking technologies and an ACM Fellow in 2019 for contributions to location tracking algorithms. He is the first and only ACM Fellow in the Middle East and Africa.

He is the founder and director of the Wireless Research Center, Egypt.

== Early life and education ==
Moustafa Youssef was born in 1975, in Alexandria, Egypt. He received a Bachelor of Science and Master of Science degrees in Computer and Systems Engineering from Alexandria University before moving to the United States to complete his PhD at the University of Maryland at College Park, supervised by Ashok Agrawala.

== Career ==
After completing his PhD in the United States, Youssef decided to return to Egypt, where he currently holds an appointment as professor at Alexandria University and The American University in Cairo. Since his return to Egypt, he went on sabbatical to different Egyptian universities including Nile University and Egypt-Japan University of Science and Technology. He established the Wireless Research Center in 2010, which he is currently directing.

Since 2015, he has been appointed as a Visiting Professor at the National Institute of Informatics (NII), Japan. He has been also a regular Visiting Researcher at Google since 2016.

=== Research ===
Youssef's key work focuses on pervasive and mobile computing with a focus on location determination systems and algorithms. His Ph.D. thesis gave the design and implementation of the Horus WLAN location determination system. The Horus system is considered to be one of the earliest WiFi-based tracking systems and the first probabilistic scheme.

In 2007, he was the main author of the ACM MobiCom Vision/Challenges paper that introduced the concept of device-free localization (also known as sensor-less sensing and through-the-wall sensing), one of the still current hot topics in location tracking and sensing research. Traditional tracking techniques require attaching a device to the tracked entity. Device-free localization allows detecting, tracking, and identifying objects without any attachment, by analyzing their effect on the ambient wireless signals. This paradigm-shifting approach for localization opens the door for many novel applications such as intrusion detection, smart homes, and ubiquitous gesture-controlled IoT devices, among many others.

In 2012, he introduced a vision and system for leveraging crowdsourced phone sensor data to automatically construct indoor floorplans by a building’s everyday users. This provided a solution to one of the hurdles of ubiquitous indoor localization, but it also sparked follow-on work by others that build different layers of semantics, e.g. points of interest and place functionalities. This work won the 2013 COMESA Innovation Award.

In 2013, he introduced the DejaVu system for providing energy-efficient highly-accurate GPS replacement. GPS-replacement systems usually traded accuracy for energy-efficiency. DejaVu uses the energy-efficient phone sensors to detect virtual landmarks in the physical space that can be used to accurately pinpoint the users location. The results in the paper, that won the best paper award at the ACM SGSpatial'13 conference, show that DejaVu can obtain better accuracy than GPS, while having an order of magnitude saving in energy. DejaVu also won the 2015 COMESA Innovation Award.

In 2015, his WiGest gesture recognition system, using the human body as an RF antenna, leverages the concept of sensor-less sensing to provide a calibration-free high-accuracy gesture recognition system for any Wi-Fi-enabled device. The idea is to leverage the changes in the ambient WiFi signals to detect the gesture the user is performing with their phone, a phenomenon called inverse synthetic-aperture radar. The system can achieve high accuracy without any pre-training.

In 2019, his paper in the IEEE Pervasive Computing Magazine extends the concept of sensor-less sensing to include sensing indirectly through the energy harvested from the Internet of Things (IoT) devices. The key concept is that the motion of persons and their hands will affect the energy harvested from the IoT devices (e.g. those using solar panels) and hence, by analyzing the changes in the harvested energy, one can sense the environment without using custom sensors.

=== Awards and honors ===
In 2019, Youssef became the first computer scientist in the Middle East and Africa to be named an ACM Fellow for his contributions to location tracking algorithms.

He was also named a Fellow of the Institute of Electrical and Electronics Engineers (IEEE) in the same year.

In 2017, he received the Egyptian State Excellence Award.

In 2015, he was named a Distinguished Scientist of the Association for Computing Machinery. In the same year, he also won the COMESA Innovation Award for his DejaVu GPS-replacement technology. Moreover, he received the Alexandria University Commemorative Medal.

In 2013, he won the COMESA Innovation Award for his CrowdInside system for the automatic construction of indoor floorplans. He also received the Egyptian Dr. Venice Kamel Gouda's Award for Innovative Technologies.

In 2012, he received the Egyptian State Encouragement Award for Engineering Sciences.

In 2010, he received the joint TWAS-AAS-Microsoft Award for Young Scientists.

In 2004, his thesis work received the Invention of the Year Award from the University of Maryland, College Park.

In 1997, he was awarded Prof. Abdelsamie Moustafa award, and Prof. Naim Aboutaleb award from the Faculty of Engineering, Alexandria University for being ranked first on the Faculty of Engineering and the Computer and Systems Engineering Department, respectively.

In 1992, he received the Egyptian Ministry of Education Certificate of Honor for being ranked Third Nationwide in the General Secondary School Certificate exam.

== Media coverage ==
Youssef's research has attracted the general and technical media. On September 21, 2012, his CrowdInside system for the automatic construction of indoor floorplans was featured in the MIT Technology Review Magazine. On July 2, 2012, his Unloc indoor location determination system was cited in the Scientific American Magazine.

On March 10, 2005, his Horus Wi-Fi-based location determination system was cited in the Washington Times Newspaper. Similarly, the Horus system was also cited on June 19, 2003 in the New York Times Newspaper.

He is also regularly invited on different Egyptian Talk Shows to talk about his research including Al Qahera Al Youm, Nile TV International, Alexandria Satellite Channel, and the Egyptian National Satellite Channel.

His news are regularly covered by the Egyptian and international media including Al Jazeera, Dar Al Maaref, among others.
