= Friedemann Mattern =

German computer scientist

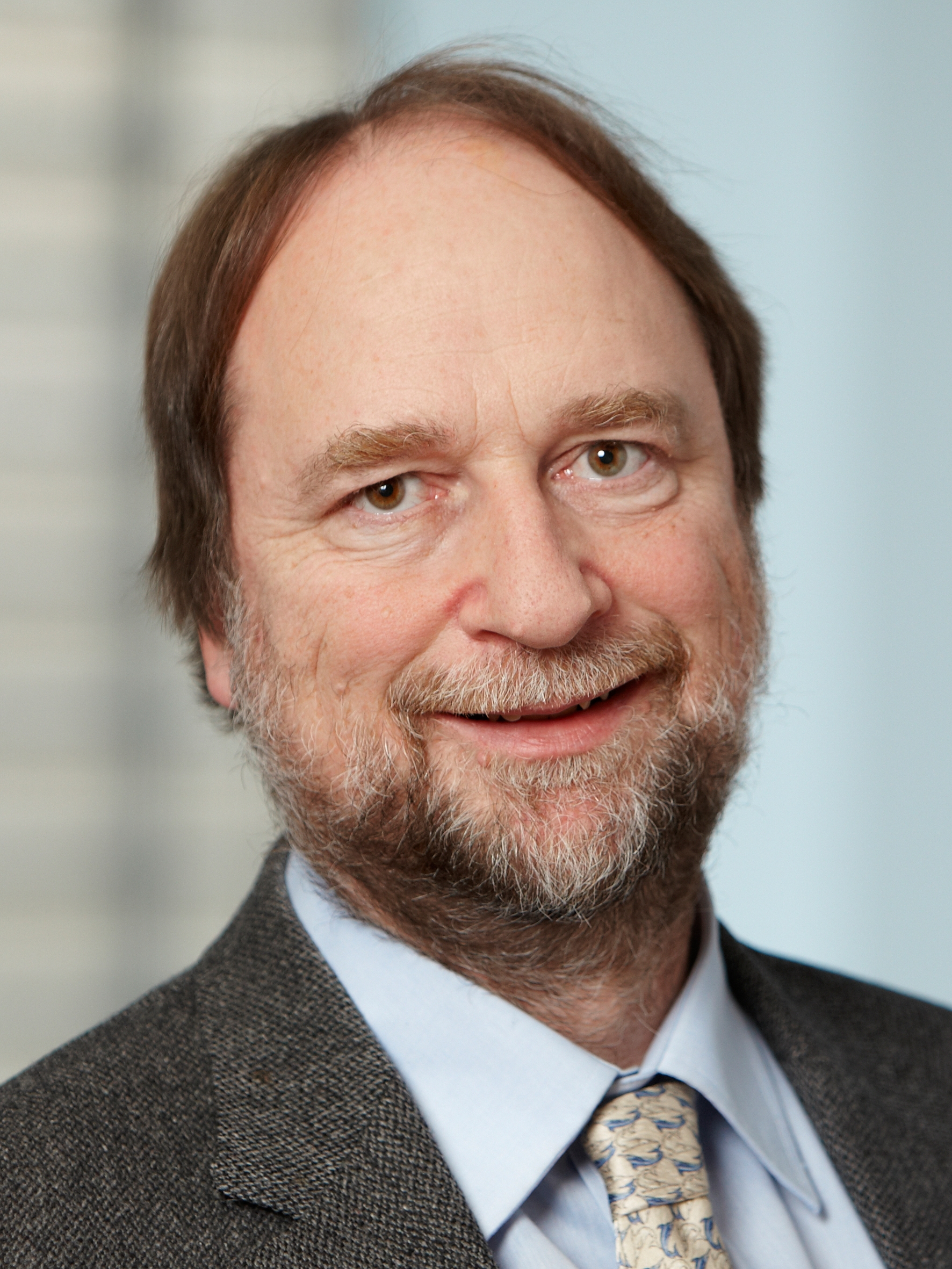
Friedemann Mattern (2014).

Friedemann Mattern (born 28 July 1955) is a German scientist.

After studying computer science with a minor in communication sciences at the University of Bonn, Mattern became a VLSI design and parallelism researcher at Kaiserslautern University of Technology. He got his doctorate degree in 1989 after writing a dissertation on distributed algorithms. In 1991 Mattern was offered a teaching position at Saarland University in Saarbrücken; in 1994 he moved to the Department of Computer Science of the Technische Universität Darmstadt. In 1999 Mattern responded to ETH Zurich's call for the establishment of a Ubiquitous Computing research group. Since fall 2002, he has been on the Institute for Pervasive Computing Founding Board. Currently he is in charge of the Distributed Systems program at ETH Zurich. Mattern is also a co-founder of the common M-Lab Competency Center at ETH Zurich and the University of St. Gallen.

Together with Colin Fidge, he developed the vector clock algorithm, which allows one to generate a partial ordering of events in a distributed system and to detect causality violations.

== Publications ==
- Distributed Algorithms for Termination Detection
- Virtual Time and Global States of Distributed Systems
- Detecting Causal Relationships in Distributed Computations: In Search of the Holy Grail
- Social, Economic, and Ethical Implications of Ambient Intelligence and Ubiquitous Computing
- Vom Verschwinden des Computers - Die Vision des Ubiquitous Computing
- Das Internet der Dinge: Ubiquitous Computing und RFID in der Praxis. Visionen, Technologien, Anwendungen, Handlungsanleitungen ( 2005, Springer Berlin Heidelberg New York, ISBN 3-540-24003-9) (as editor alongside Elgar Fleisch)
