= Adversarial queueing network =

In queueing theory, an adversarial queueing network is a model where the traffic to the network is supplied by an opponent rather than as the result of a stochastic process.

== History ==
The model was first introduced in 1996. It has seen use in describing the impact of packet injections on the performance of communication networks. The stability of an adversarial queueing network can be determined by considering a fluid limit.
