= Suzuki–Kasami algorithm =

The Suzuki–Kasami algorithm is a token-based algorithm for achieving mutual exclusion in distributed systems. The process holding the token is the only process able to enter its critical section.

This is a modification to Ricart–Agrawala algorithm in which a REQUEST and REPLY message are used for attaining the critical section, but in this algorithm, a method was introduced in which a seniority vise and also by handing over the critical section to other node by sending a single PRIVILEGE message to other node. So, the node which has the privilege it can use the critical section and if it does not have one it cannot. If a process wants to enter its critical section and it does not have the token, it broadcasts a request message to all other processes in the system. The process that has the token, if it is not currently in a critical section, will then send the token to the requesting process. The algorithm makes use of increasing Request Numbers to allow messages to arrive out-of-order.

== Algorithm description ==
Let $n$ be the number of processes. Each process is identified by an integer in $1, ..., n$.

=== Data structures ===
Each process maintains one data structure:

- an array $RN_i[n]$ (for Request Number), $i$ being the ID of the process containing this array, where $RN_i[j]$ stores the last Request Number received by $i$ from $j$

The token contains two data structures:

- an array $LN[n]$ (for Last request Number), where $LN[j]$ stores the most recent Request Number of process $j$ for which the token was successfully granted
- a queue $Q$, storing the ID of processes waiting for the token

=== Algorithm ===
==== Requesting the critical section (CS) ====
When process $i$ wants to enter the CS, if it does not have the token, it:

- increments its sequence number $RN_i[i]$
- sends a request message containing new sequence number to all processes in the system

==== Releasing the CS ====
When process $i$ leaves the CS, it:

- sets $LN[i]$ of the token equal to $RN_i[i]$. This indicates that its request $RN_i[i]$ has been executed
- for every process $k$ not in the token queue $Q$, it appends $k$ to $Q$ if $RN_i[k] = LN[k] + 1$. This indicates that process $k$ has an outstanding request
- if the token queue $Q$ is not empty after this update, it pops a process ID $j$ from $Q$ and sends the token to $j$
- otherwise, it keeps the token

==== Receiving a request ====
When process $j$ receives a request from $i$ with sequence number $s$, it:

- sets $RN_j[i]$ to $max(RN_j[i], s)$ (if $s < RN_j[i]$, the message is outdated)
- if process $j$ has the token and is not in CS, and if $RN_j[i] == LN[i] + 1$ (indicating an outstanding request), it sends the token to process $i$

==== Executing the CS ====
A process enters the CS when it has acquired the token.

=== Performance ===
- Either $0$ or $N$ messages for CS invocation (no messages if process holds the token; otherwise $N-1$ requests and $1$ reply)
- Synchronization delay is $0$ or $N$ ($N - 1$ requests and $1$ reply)

== Notes on the algorithm ==
- Only the site currently holding the token can access the CS

- All processes involved in the assignment of the CS

- Request messages sent to all nodes

- Not based on Lamport’s logical clock
- The algorithm uses sequence numbers instead

- Used to keep track of outdated requests
- They advance independently on each site

The main design issues of the algorithm:

- Telling outdated requests from current ones
- Determining which site is going to get the token next
