= Ashok Agrawala =

Indian-American computer scientist

Ashok Agrawala is Professor in the Department of Computer Science at University of Maryland at College Park and Director of the Maryland Information and Network Dynamics (MIND) Lab. He is the author of seven books and over two hundred peer-reviewed publications. Glenn Ricart and Ashok Agrawala developed the Ricart-Agrawala Algorithm. The Ricart-Agrawala Algorithm is an algorithm for mutual exclusion on a distributed system. This algorithm is an extension and optimization of Lamport's Distributed Mutual Exclusion Algorithm.

== Biography ==
Agrawala received B.E. and M.E. degrees in Electrical Engineering from Indian Institute of Science, Bangalore, India in 1963 and 1965 respectively; Masters and Ph.D. degrees in Applied Mathematics from Harvard University, Cambridge, Massachusetts under the supervision of Yu-Chi Ho in 1970.

He started his professional career as Senior Engineer at the Applied Research Lab of Honeywell in Waltham, Massachusetts in 1968 and developed an Optical character recognition machine. He started his academic career at the University of Maryland, College Park in 1971 as assistant professor of Computer Science where he rose to the rank of Full Professor in 1982.

He has at least two children, including computer-graphics researcher Maneesh Agrawala.

== Academic work ==
Agrawala started the MIND Lab (Maryland Information and Network Dynamics Lab) in 2001 and continues to serve as its director. The Lab has been involved in the development indoor location technology and accurate clock synchronization technology, and actively participated in the semantic web research. The technologies developed in the MIND lab have resulted in 4 startup companies in Maryland. he also started the MAXWell Lab which became the only WiMAX Forum Applications Lab in the western hemisphere.

Recently his work focuses on Context-aware pervasive systems and has developed, M-Urgency, a system to support public safety by providing real-time audio and video, along with location etc. from an incident scene. The general framework for context-aware system is being developed as Rover System which is designed to provide relevant information to decision makers about a situation at hand.

In a research study, he was recognized to be the 27th top nurturer in Computer Science in the world.

He was elected Fellow of the Institute of Electrical and Electronics Engineers in 1991 for contributions to distributed algorithms and policies for computer systems and a Fellow of the AAAS in 2005. He is a Senior Member of the ACM, and a member of Sigma Xi.

=== Achievements ===
- Development of M-Urgency: Groundbreaking Smartphone App Fights Crime at UMD
- Introducing the Ricart/Agrawala algorithm for distributed mutual exclusion leading to major worldwide research activities
- Development of the Maruti Operating System and program development environment demonstrating temporal guarantees of few tens of nanoseconds for making any software event happen while running on commercial Pentium processors
- Development of Cyclone technology giving a jitter-free, loss-free delivery of data end-to-end in very high speed networks
- Development of Horus Technology, an indoor location technology based on RSSI in WiFi environment giving accuracy of less than 2 ft.
- Development of PinPoint Technology, a time of flight based, highly accurate location technology that allows users to locate objects within inches of specified coordinates both indoors and outdoors and synchronize clocks to within 20 ns
- Development of Context-Aware system, Rover, for providing significantly improving situational awareness

== See also ==
- Maneesh Agrawala, his son, also a computer scientist
