= Glenn Ricart =

Computer scientist and Internet pioneer

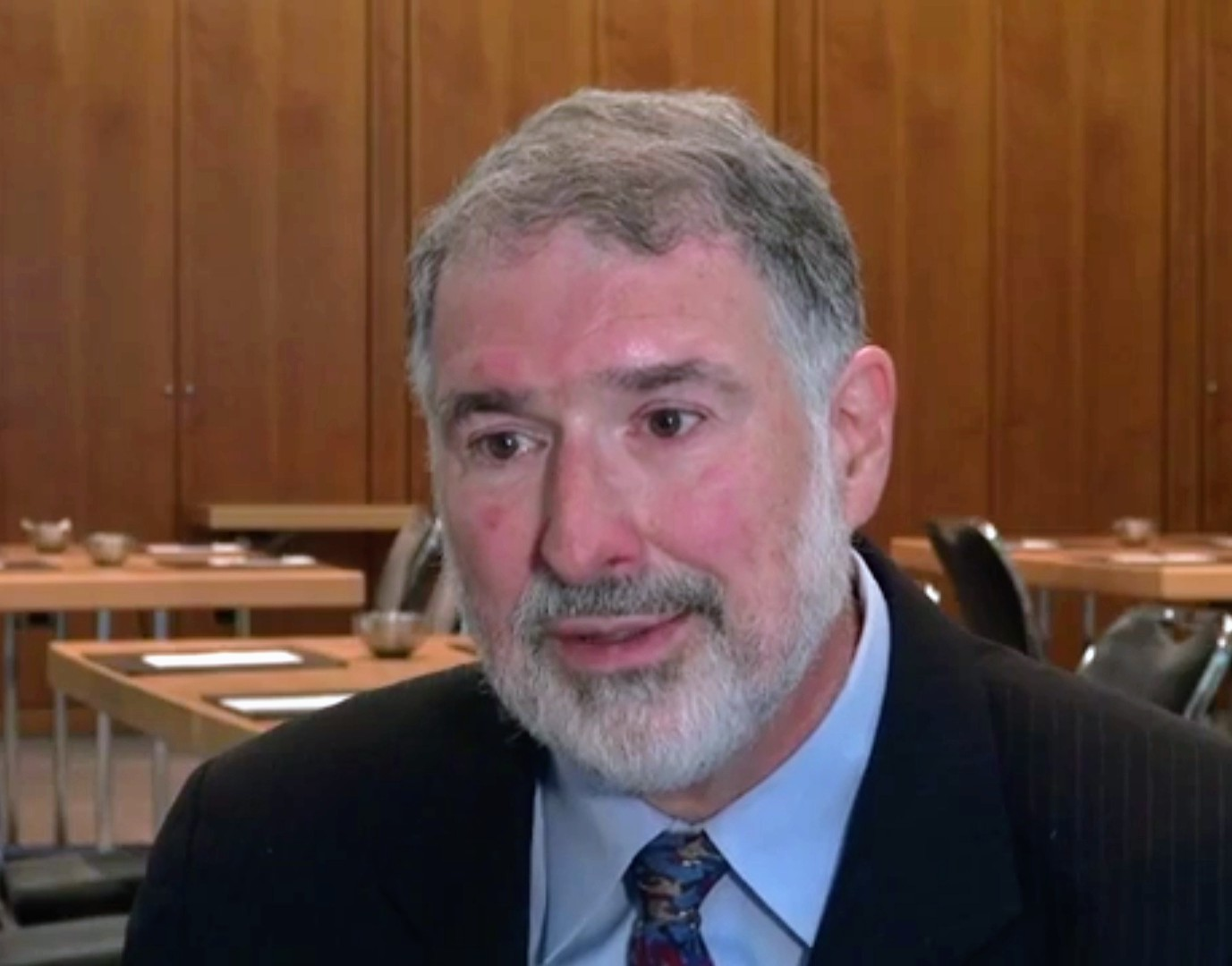
- Born: August 1, 1949 (age 76)
- Occupation: Computer scientist
- Known for: ARPANET pioneer, OSPF

Glenn Ricart (born August 1, 1949) is a computer scientist. He was influential in the development of the Internet (ARPANET) going back to 1969 and early implementation of the TCP/IP protocol. Since then he has been active in technology and business as well as donating his time to philanthropic and educational movements.

== Education ==
Ricart received his B.S. degree in engineering from Case Institute of Technology in 1971, and his M.S. in Computing and Information Sciences from Case Western Reserve University in 1973. He received his doctorate in the University of Maryland Department of Computer Science, which is part of the University of Maryland College of Computer, Mathematical, and Natural Sciences in 1980, mentored by Ashok Agrawala.

The Ricart-Agrawala Algorithm was the result of his dissertation work at the University of Maryland.

== Career ==
Ricart set up what was probably the first Internet exchange point, the Federal Internet Exchange (FIX) in College Park, Maryland, which interconnected the original federal TCP/IP networks and was extended to form MAE-East. Ricart led the team that wrote the code for the first implementation of TCP/IP for the IBM PC. He then secured financial support from IBM for writing the code, and, in addition to its free availability to the education community, arranged for IBM to sell it as IBM's entry into the field (the product was called PC/IP by IBM). He led the team that developed the OSPF reference implementation at the University of Maryland, including Louis Mamakos and Mike Petry. He also led the team that provided and operated the routers for the first NSFNet backbone.

From 1971 to 1982, he was a lead software engineer at the National Institutes of Health, developing the first e-mail program for the TOPS-10 (PDP-10) operating system in 1973. From 1982 to 1993, he headed academic computing at the University of Maryland. In 1984, it became the first campus to adopt TCP/IP campus-wide and use it to connect all academic minicomputers and mainframes.

In 1985 to 1989, he was instrumental in bringing the Internet to South America, helping to bring the first BITNET and Internet connections to Brazil in partnership with CNPq, Argentina via the University of Buenos Aires, and Chile by first connecting REUNA. He instructed the first networking workshop for Latin and South America (ESLARED) and several succeeding workshops.

From 1993 to 1995, Ricart was a Program Manager at DARPA for operating systems, middleware, and end-system security. From 1995 to 1999, he was chief technology officer at Novell, helping to move that company from the proprietary Xerox Network Systems protocol to also embrace TCP/IP. In 1999, he co-founded CenterBeam, a start-up based on remote system management driven by directory services.

From 2003 to 2009, he was the founding managing director of the PricewaterhouseCoopers Center for Advanced Research based in San Jose, California.

In October 2009 Ricart was named president and CEO of National LambdaRail, the high-speed networking platform owned by the U.S. research and education community. On September 7, 2010, he announced his resignation from National LambdaRail due to strategic differences with the board.

In 2010 he presented the Bernard Price Memorial Lecture in South Africa.

Ricart is a co-founder of US Ignite, a nonprofit organization launched in 2012 with support from the National Science Foundation and numerous public and private stakeholders. US Ignite's mission is to foster the development of broadband-intensive applications with an eye toward "smart city" and other public good uses.

He previously served on the boards of the Internet Society, BITNET, CACI, First USA Financial Services, Santa Cruz Operation, and NASULGC. He is the CTO of Artkick - a service that displays artwork on televisions.

== Awards ==
In 2013, he was inducted into the Internet Hall of Fame.
