= Maneesh Agrawala =

American computer scientist (born 1972)

- Education: Stanford University
- Father: Ashok Agrawala
- Awards: MacArthur Fellowship (2009)
- Scientific career
- Fields: Computer scientist
- Workplaces: Berkeley, Stanford
- Doctoral advisor: Pat Hanrahan

Maneesh Agrawala (born 1972) is a professor of computer science at Stanford University. He returned to Stanford in 2015 as the director of the Brown Institute for Media Innovation, after nearly a decade on the faculty at the University of California, Berkeley.

== Life and work ==
Maneesh Agrawala was born to computer-science professor Ashok Agrawala, who worked at the University of Maryland. He attended the Science, Mathematics, and Computer Science Magnet Program at Montgomery Blair High School in Silver Spring, MD. Alongside Howard Gobioff, Agrawala was part of a team that won a supercomputer in the 1988 SuperQuest competition. He was a finalist in the 1990 Westinghouse Science Talent Search.

He received a B.S. in mathematics in 1994 and a Ph.D. in computer science in 2002, both from Stanford University. While attending Stanford, he worked as a software consultant at Vicinity Corporation and in the rendering software group at Pixar Animation Studios. He received a film credit for Pixar's A Bug's Life. After graduating, Agrawala worked at Microsoft Research for three years before joining the faculty at the University of California, Berkeley.

Agrawala's work focuses on the design of visual interfaces that help a user process digital information, often using cognitive design concepts. For instance, LineDrive, a program developed by Agrawala, creates route maps that resemble hand-drawn maps, adapting cognitive and map-making techniques to help a computer user process information on a route. This work was the focus of his 2002 Ph.D. dissertation, "Visualizing Route Maps". He has also adapted cognitive science into visual interfaces for complex 3D models. Agrawala has also developed a system that creates step-by-step assembly instructions for complex machines, using the idea of exploded views to help the user understand the spatial relationships between elements. His user-centric approach is viewed as having broad applicability in the fields of computer graphics and user interfaces.

Agrawala is the recipient of multiple awards, including an Okawa Foundation Research Grant in 2006, a Sloan Fellowship and NSF CAREER Award in 2007, a SIGGRAPH Significant New Researcher Award in 2008, and a MacArthur Foundation Fellowship in 2009. He was named to the 2022 class of ACM Fellows, "for contributions to visual communication through computer graphics, human-computer interaction, and information visualization".
