= Fluid limit =

In queueing theory, a discipline within the mathematical theory of probability, a fluid limit, fluid approximation or fluid analysis of a stochastic model is a deterministic real-valued process which approximates the evolution of a given stochastic process, usually subject to some scaling or limiting criteria.

Fluid limits were first introduced by Thomas G. Kurtz publishing a law of large numbers and central limit theorem for Markov chains. It is known that a queueing network can be stable, but have an unstable fluid limit.
